= West Coast Conference baseball tournament =

- Conference baseball championship
- Sport: Baseball
- Conference: West Coast Conference
- Number of teams: 6
- Format: Double-elimination
- Current stadium: Scottsdale Stadium
- Current location: Scottsdale, AZ
- Played: 2013–present
- Last contest: 2026
- Current champion: Saint Mary's (3)
- Most championships: San Diego; Saint Mary's (3)

The West Coast Conference baseball tournament is the conference baseball championship of the Division I West Coast Conference. As begun in 2013, the top four finishers in the regular season of the league's ten teams participate in the double-elimination tournament held at Banner Island Ballpark in Stockton, California. The winner of the event earns the conference's automatic bid to the NCAA Division I Baseball Championship.

== History ==
The West Coast Conference was one of the few college baseball leagues not to conduct a postseason championship event until dividing into two divisions in 1999. From that year through 2009, the league held a best of three game championship series between the two division winners. Division play was abolished following the 2005 season, but the championship series continued with the top two finishers in the conference participating. After 2009, the championship series was also discontinued. However, in 2013, the league established a four team, double-elimination event at a neutral site. This was the first time in baseball that more than two teams participated in a postseason conference championship event and the first time any conference championship event is held at a neutral site.

== Champions ==
=== By year ===
This table lists results of West Coast Conference postseason conference championship events.

Year	Champion	Runner-up	Site	Most Outstanding Players
Baseball Championship Series era (1999–2009): A two team "best of three" playoff was held.
1999	Loyola Marymount	Pepperdine	Alternating campus sites	N/A
2000	Loyola Marymount	Pepperdine	George C. Page Stadium • Los Angeles, CA	N/A
2001	Pepperdine	Gonzaga	Eddy D. Field Stadium • Malibu, CA	N/A
2002	San Diego	Pepperdine	Eddy D. Field Stadium • Malibu, CA	N/A
2003	San Diego	Pepperdine	Eddy D. Field Stadium • Malibu, CA	N/A
2004	Pepperdine	Loyola Marymount	George C. Page Stadium • Los Angeles, CA	N/A
2005	Pepperdine	Loyola Marymount	George C. Page Stadium • Los Angeles, CA	N/A
2006	Pepperdine	San Francisco	Benedetti Diamond • San Francisco, CA	N/A
2007	San Diego	Gonzaga	John Cunningham Stadium • San Diego, CA	Justin Snyder, San Diego; Matt Couch, San Diego (Pitcher)
2008	San Diego	Pepperdine	John Cunningham Stadium • San Diego, CA	Kevin Muno, San Diego; Brian Matusz, San Diego (Pitcher)
2009	Gonzaga	Loyola Marymount	Patterson Baseball Complex • Spokane, WA	Ryan Wiegand, Gonzaga; Steven Ames, Gonzaga (Pitcher)
Tournament era (2013−present)
2013	San Diego	San Francisco	Banner Island Ballpark • Stockton, CA	Troy Conyers, San Diego
2014	Pepperdine	Loyola Marymount	Banner Island Ballpark • Stockton, CA	Aaron Brown, Pepperdine
2015	Pepperdine	Loyola Marymount	Banner Island Ballpark • Stockton, CA	Brad Anderson, Pepperdine
2016	Saint Mary's	Gonzaga	Banner Island Ballpark • Stockton, CA	Zach Kirtley, Saint Mary's
2017	BYU	Gonzaga	Banner Island Ballpark • Stockton, CA	Bronson Larsen, BYU
2018	Gonzaga	Pepperdine	Banner Island Ballpark • Stockton, CA	Jake Vieth, Gonzaga
2019	Loyola Marymount	Saint Mary's	Banner Island Ballpark • Stockton, CA	Codie Paiva, Loyola Marymount
2020	Cancelled due to the coronavirus pandemic			
2021	Cancelled due to the coronavirus pandemic			
2022	San Diego	Gonzaga	Banner Island Ballpark • Stockton, CA	Caleb Ricketts, San Diego
2023	Santa Clara	Portland	Las Vegas Ballpark • Summerlin South, NV	Dawson Brigman, Santa Clara
2024	San Diego	Portland	Las Vegas Ballpark • Summerlin South, NV	Jake Holcroft, Portland
2025	Saint Mary's	San Diego	Las Vegas Ballpark • Summerlin South, NV	Eddie Madrigal, Saint Mary's
2026	Saint Mary's	San Francisco	Scottsdale Stadium • Scottsdale, AZ	Ian Armstrong, Saint Mary's

=== By school ===
Team	Total Championships	Tournament Championships	Playoff Championships
San Diego	7	2013, 2022, 2024	2002, 2003, 2007, 2008
Pepperdine	6	2014, 2015	2001, 2004, 2005, 2006
Loyola Marymount	3	2019	1999, 2000
Saint Mary's	3	2016, 2025, 2026	-
Gonzaga	2	2018	2009
Santa Clara	1	2023	-
BYU	1	2017	-
San Francisco	0	-	-
Portland	0	-	-
Pacific	0	-	-
Seattle	0	-	-

Pink denotes former WCC member. Gonzaga plans to leave in 2026 while UC San Diego plans to join in 2027-28.
