= List of West Coast Conference baseball champions =

This is a list of West Coast Conference champions in college baseball. The West Coast Conference is composed of nine schools, all of which participate in baseball, with each school playing all of the others in three-game series. Brigham Young University joined the league in 2012. From 1999 through 2005, the eight teams were divided into two divisions, with the winner of each meeting in a three-game championship series. Division were abolished beginning in 2006, but the championship series remained through the 2009 season with the top two teams from the regular season meeting. The league will begin a four team tournament in 2013, in anticipation of growing to a ten team conference when the University of the Pacific joins the league. The winner of the tournament will claim the conference's automatic bid to the NCAA Division I Baseball Championship.

The conference began sponsoring baseball under the name West Coast Athletic Conference in 1968 and crowned a champion each year through 1976. Beginning in 1977, the league joined with the Big West Conference for baseball, with competition in two separate conferences - the Northern California Baseball Association and the Southern California Baseball Association. This arrangement lasted through the 1984 season, when the league once again began sponsoring baseball for its members. In 1989, the conference shortened the name to West Coast Conference.

== Champions ==
=== West Coast Athletic Conference ===
Year	Regular Season Champion	Record
1968	No. 20 Santa Clara	15–5
1969	No. 9 Santa Clara	16–4
1970	No. 14 Santa Clara	19–2
1971	No. 9 Santa Clara	18–2
1972	No. 20 Santa Clara	13–5
1973	No. 25 Loyola Marymount	14–4
1974	No. 24 Pepperdine	15–3
1975	No. 10 Pepperdine	14–2
1976	Pepperdine	16–2

=== Northern California Baseball Association ===
Year	Champion	Record
1977	No. 21 Fresno State	26–10
1978	Santa Clara	23–8
1979	Fresno State	23–13
1980	No. 24 Fresno State	31–3
1981	No. 20 Fresno State	26–10
1982	No. 13 Fresno State; Santa Clara	30–6; 26–10
1983	No. 11 Fresno State	22–8
1984	No. 14 Fresno State	28–2

=== Southern California Baseball Association ===
Year	Champion	Record
1977	No. 20 Cal State Fullerton; No. 4 Cal State Los Angeles	17–7
1978	No. 21 Cal State Fullerton	24–4
1979	No. 1 Cal State Fullerton	23–4
1980	No. 23 Cal State Fullerton	20–8
1981	No. 9 Cal State Fullerton	22–6
1982	No. 8 Cal State Fullerton	23–5
1983	No. 20 Cal State Fullerton; No. 13 UC Santa Barbara	22–6
1984	No. 1 Cal State Fullerton	22–6

=== West Coast Athletic Conference/West Coast Conference ===
Year	Regular Season Champion	Record	Postseason Champion
1985	No. 9 Pepperdine	20–4	
1986	No. 6 Loyola Marymount; No. 14 Pepperdine	19–5	Loyola Marymount def. Pepperdine 14–9 in one game playoff
1987	No. 17 Pepperdine	22–2	
1988	No. 12 Pepperdine	19–4–1	
1989	Pepperdine	20–4	
1990	No. 25 Loyola Marymount	25–9	
1991	No. 19 Pepperdine	25–10	
1992	No. 1 Pepperdine	23–4	
1993	No. 16 Pepperdine	24–6	
1994	Santa Clara	21–9	
1995	No. 19 Pepperdine	23–3–1	
1996	Santa Clara	22–6	
1997	No. 19 Santa Clara	23–5	
1998	Loyola Marymount	21–8	
1999	No. 19 Pepperdine (West); Loyola Marymount (Coast)	21–9; 18–12	Loyola Marymount def. Pepperdine (2–1); 1999 West Coast Conference Baseball Championship Series
2000	Pepperdine (West); No. 24 Loyola Marymount (Coast)	22–8; 22–8	Loyola Marymount def. Pepperdine (2–0); 2000 West Coast Conference Baseball Championship Series
2001	No. 20 Pepperdine (West); Gonzaga (Coast)	25–5; 17–13	Pepperdine def. Gonzaga (2–1); 2001 West Coast Conference Baseball Championship Series
2002	Pepperdine (Coast); San Diego (West)	18–12; 18–12	San Diego def. Pepperdine (2–1); 2002 West Coast Conference Baseball Championship Series
2003	Pepperdine (Coast); San Diego (West)	23–7; 18–12	San Diego def. Pepperdine (2–1); 2003 West Coast Conference Baseball Championship Series
2004	Loyola Marymount (Coast); Pepperdine (West)	20–7; 19–11	Pepperdine def. Loyola Marymount (2–0); 2004 West Coast Conference Baseball Championship Series
2005	Loyola Marymount (Coast); No. 23 Pepperdine (West)	18–12; 21–9	Pepperdine def. Loyola Marymount (2–1); 2005 West Coast Conference Baseball Championship Series
2006	No. 30 Pepperdine; San Francisco	15–6	Pepperdine def. San Francisco (2–1); 2006 West Coast Conference Baseball Championship Series
2007	No. 16 San Diego	18–3	San Diego def. Gonzaga (2–1); 2007 West Coast Conference Baseball Championship Series
2008	No. 17 San Diego	16–5	San Diego def. Pepperdine (2–0); 2008 West Coast Conference Baseball Championship Series
2009	Gonzaga	14–7	Gonzaga def. Loyola Marymount (2–0); 2009 West Coast Conference Baseball Championship Series
2010	San Diego	19–2	No tournament held
2011	San Francisco	16–5	No tournament held
2012	No. 28 Pepperdine	16–8	No tournament held
2013	Gonzaga	18–6	(2) San Diego def. (4) San Francisco 2–0; 2013 West Coast Conference baseball tournament
2014	No. 11 Pepperdine	18–9	(1) Pepperdine def. (2) Loyola Marymount 6–1; 2014 West Coast Conference baseball tournament
2015	San Diego	19–8	(2) Pepperdine def. (4) Loyola Marymount 4–2; 2015 West Coast Conference baseball tournament
2016	BYU; Gonzaga; Saint Mary's	18–9	(1) Saint Mary's def. (3) Gonzaga 13–4; 2016 West Coast Conference baseball tournament
2017	BYU; Gonzaga; Loyola Marymount	20–7	(3) BYU def. (1) Gonzaga 10–3, 16–3; 2017 West Coast Conference baseball tournament
2018	Pepperdine	17–10	(2) Gonzaga def. (1) Pepperdine 17–2; 2018 West Coast Conference baseball tournament
2019	BYU	19–8	(4) Loyola Marymount def. (3) Saint Mary's 4–2 (10); 2019 West Coast Conference baseball tournament
2020	Season cancelled in March due to the coronavirus pandemic		
2021	No. 25 Gonzaga	20–7	Cancelled due to the coronavirus pandemic
2022	No. 12 Gonzaga	20–7	(3) San Diego def. (1) Gonzaga 15–12 (11); 2022 West Coast Conference baseball tournament
2023	Loyola Marymount	21–6	(3) Santa Clara def. (2) Portland 6-0; 2023 West Coast Conference baseball tournament
2024	San Diego	20–4	(1) San Diego def. (2) Portland 8-6; 2024 West Coast Conference baseball tournament
