= 2007 West Coast Conference Baseball Championship Series =

2007 West Coast Conference baseball tournament
- Teams: 4
- Format: Double-elimination
- Finals site: John Cunningham Stadium; San Diego, California
- Champions: San Diego (3rd title)
- Winning coach: Rich Hill (3rd title)
- MVP: Player: Justin Snyder (San Diego); Pitcher: Matt Couch (San Diego) ()

2007 West Coast Conference baseball standings
	Conf.				Overall
Team	W		L	PCT	W		L	PCT
No. 16 San Diego ‍†‍‡‍^{y}	18	–	3	.857	43	–	18	.705
Gonzaga ‍‍‍	15	–	6	.714	33	–	25	.569
Pepperdine ‍‍‍^{y}	14	–	7	.667	35	–	22	.614
San Francisco ‍‍‍	9	–	12	.429	27	–	28	.491
Santa Clara ‍‍‍	9	–	12	.429	27	–	29	.482
Loyola Marymount ‍‍‍	9	–	12	.429	22	–	33	.400
Portland ‍‍‍	7	–	14	.333	21	–	30	.412
Saint Mary's ‍‍‍	3	–	18	.143	21	–	29	.420
† – Conference champion ‡ – Championship Series champion y – Invited to the NCAA tournament As of June 30, 2007; Rankings from Collegiate Baseball

The 2007 West Coast Conference Baseball Championship Series was held on May 25 through 27, 2007 at San Diego's home stadium, John Cunningham Stadium in San Diego, California, and pitted the top two finishers from the WCC regular season. The event determined the champion of the West Coast Conference for the 2007 NCAA Division I baseball season. San Diego won the series two games to one over Gonzaga and earned the league's automatic bid to the 2007 NCAA Division I baseball tournament.

== Seeding ==
Team	W–L	Pct	GB
San Diego	18–3	.857	—
Gonzaga	15–6	.714	3
Pepperdine	14–7	.667	4
San Francisco	9–12	.429	9
Santa Clara	9–12	.429	9
Loyola Marymount	9–12	.429	9
Portland	7–14	.333	11
Saint Mary's	3–18	.143	15

== Results ==
Game One

May 25, 2007
Team	R
Gonzaga	6
San Diego	4

Game Two

May 26, 2007
Team	R
San Diego	11
Gonzaga	0

Game Three

May 27, 2007
Team	R
Gonzaga	4
San Diego	9
