= 2002 West Coast Conference Baseball Championship Series =

2002 West Coast Conference baseball tournament
- Teams: 4
- Format: Double-elimination
- Finals site: Eddy D. Field Stadium; Malibu, California
- Champions: San Diego (1st title)
- Winning coach: Rich Hill (1st title)

2002 West Coast Conference baseball standings
| | Conf. | | | | Overall |
| Team | W | | L | PCT | W | | L | PCT |
|---|---|---|---|---|---|---|---|---|
West
| San Diego ^{x}‍‍‡‍^{y} | 18 | – | 12 | .600 | 39 | – | 23 | .629 |
| Portland ‍‍‍ | 16 | – | 14 | .533 | 39 | – | 23 | .629 |
| Loyola Marymount ‍‍‍ | 15 | – | 15 | .500 | 22 | – | 33 | .400 |
| San Francisco ‍‍‍ | 9 | – | 21 | .300 | 18 | – | 38 | .321 |
Coast
| Pepperdine ^{x}‍‍‍ | 18 | – | 12 | .600 | 31 | – | 32 | .492 |
| Santa Clara ‍‍‍ | 15 | – | 14 | .517 | 25 | – | 30 | .455 |
| Saint Mary's ‍‍‍ | 14 | – | 15 | .483 | 22 | – | 27 | .449 |
| Gonzaga ‍‍‍ | 14 | – | 16 | .467 | 27 | – | 29 | .482 |
x – Division champion ‡ – Championship Series champion y – Invited to the NCAA tournament As of June 30, 2002; Rankings from Collegiate Baseball

The 2002 West Coast Conference Baseball Championship Series was held on May 24–26, 2002 at Pepperdine's home field, Eddy D. Field Stadium in Malibu, California, and pitted the winners of the conference's two four-team divisions. The event determined the champion of the West Coast Conference for the 2002 NCAA Division I baseball season. San Diego won the series two games to one over Pepperdine and earned the league's automatic bid to the 2002 NCAA Division I baseball tournament.

== Seeding ==
| Team | W–L | Pct | GB |
|---|---|---|---|
West Division
| San Diego | 18–12 | .600 | — |
| Portland | 16–14 | .533 | 2 |
| Loyola Marymount | 15–15 | .500 | 3 |
| San Francisco | 9–21 | .300 | 9 |

| Team | W–L–T | Pct | GB |
|---|---|---|---|
Coast Division
| Pepperdine | 18–12 | .600 | — |
| Santa Clara | 15–14 | .517 | 2.5 |
| Saint Mary's | 14–15 | .483 | 3.5 |
| Gonzaga | 14–16 | .467 | 4 |

== Results ==
Game One

May 24, 2002
| Team | R |
|---|---|
| San Diego | 7 |
| Pepperdine | 3 |

Game Two

May 25, 2002
| Team | R |
|---|---|
| Pepperdine | 15 |
| San Diego | 4 |

Game Three

May 26, 2002
| Team | R |
|---|---|
| San Diego | 5 |
| Pepperdine | 3 |
