= 2003 West Coast Conference Baseball Championship Series =

2003 West Coast Conference baseball tournament
- Teams: 4
- Format: Double-elimination
- Finals site: Eddy D. Field Stadium; Malibu, California
- Champions: San Diego (2nd title)
- Winning coach: Rich Hill (2nd title)

2003 West Coast Conference baseball standings
	Conf.						Overall
Team	W		L		T	PCT	W		L		T	PCT
West
San Diego ^{x}‍‍‡‍^{y}	18	–	12	–	0	.600	32	–	30	–	0	.516
San Francisco ‍‍‍	17	–	13	–	0	.567	25	–	31	–	0	.446
Loyola Marymount ‍‍‍	13	–	17	–	0	.433	26	–	30	–	0	.464
Portland ‍‍‍	5	–	24	–	1	.183	9	–	45	–	1	.173
Coast
Pepperdine ^{x}‍‍‍	23	–	7	–	0	.767	36	–	25	–	0	.590
Santa Clara ‍‍‍	21	–	9	–	0	.700	31	–	26	–	0	.544
Gonzaga ‍‍‍	14	–	16	–	0	.467	26	–	25	–	1	.510
Saint Mary's ‍‍‍	8	–	21	–	1	.283	18	–	37	–	1	.330
x – Division champion ‡ – Championship Series champion y – Invited to the NCAA tournament As of June 30, 2003; Rankings from Collegiate Baseball

The 2003 West Coast Conference Baseball Championship Series was held on May 23–25, 2003 at Pepperdine's home field, Eddy D. Field Stadium in Malibu, California, and pitted the winners of the conference's two four-team divisions. The event determined the champion of the West Coast Conference for the 2003 NCAA Division I baseball season. San Diego won the series two games to one over Pepperdine and earned the league's automatic bid to the 2003 NCAA Division I baseball tournament.

== Seeding ==
Team	W–L	Pct	GB
West Division
San Diego	18–12–0	.600	—
San Francisco	17–13–0	.567	1
Loyola Marymount	13–17–0	.433	5
Portland	5–24–1	.183	12.5

Team	W–L–T	Pct	GB
Coast Division
Pepperdine	23–7–0	.767	—
Santa Clara	21–9–0	.700	2
Gonzaga	14–16–0	.467	9
Saint Mary's	8–21–1	.283	8.5

== Results ==
Game One

May 23, 2003
Team	R
San Diego	8
Pepperdine	2

Game Two

May 24, 2003
Team	R
Pepperdine	7
San Diego	6

Game Three

May 25, 2003
Team	R
San Diego	3
Pepperdine	1
