= 2008 West Coast Conference Baseball Championship Series =

2008 West Coast Conference baseball tournament
- Teams: 2
- Format: Double-elimination
- Finals site: John Cunningham Stadium; San Diego, California
- Champions: San Diego (4th title)
- Winning coach: Rich Hill (4th title)
- MVP: Player: Kevin Muno (San Diego); Pitcher: Brian Matusz (San Diego) ()

2008 West Coast Conference baseball standings
	Conf.						Overall
Team	W		L		T	PCT	W		L		T	PCT
No. 17 San Diego ^{†‡y} ‍‍‍	16	–	5	–	0	.762	44	–	17	–	0	.721
Pepperdine ‍‍‍^{y}	14	–	6	–	0	.700	38	–	21	–	0	.644
Santa Clara ‍‍‍	13	–	8	–	0	.619	33	–	22	–	0	.600
San Francisco ‍‍‍	12	–	9	–	0	.571	31	–	26	–	0	.544
Gonzaga ‍‍‍	10	–	10	–	0	.500	30	–	23	–	0	.566
Saint Mary's ‍‍‍	8	–	13	–	0	.381	26	–	26	–	1	.500
Loyola Marymount ‍‍‍	7	–	14	–	0	.333	23	–	32	–	0	.418
Portland ‍‍‍	3	–	18	–	0	.143	21	–	33	–	0	.389
† – Conference champion ‡ – Championship Series champion y – Invited to the NCAA tournament As of June 30, 2008; Rankings from Collegiate Baseball

The 2008 West Coast Conference Baseball Championship Series was held on May 24, 2008 at San Diego's home stadium, John Cunningham Stadium in San Diego, California, and pitted the top two finishers from the WCC regular season. The event determined the champion of the West Coast Conference for the 2008 NCAA Division I baseball season. San Diego won the series two games to none over Pepperdine and earned the league's automatic bid to the 2008 NCAA Division I baseball tournament.

== Seeding ==
Team	W–L	Pct	GB
San Diego	16–5	.762	—
Pepperdine	14–6	.700	1.5
Santa Clara	13–8	.619	3
San Francisco	12–9	.571	4
Gonzaga	10–10	.500	5.5
Saint Mary's	8–13	.381	8
Loyola Marymount	7–14	.333	9
Portland	3–18	.143	13

== Results ==
Game One

May 24, 2008
Team	R
Pepperdine	1
San Diego	10

Game Two

May 24, 2008
Team	R
San Diego	12
Pepperdine	4
