= 2005 West Coast Conference Baseball Championship Series =

2005 West Coast Conference baseball tournament
- Teams: 4
- Format: Double-elimination
- Finals site: Eddy D. Field Stadium; Malibu, California
- Champions: Pepperdine (3rd title)
- Winning coach: Steve Rodriguez (2nd title)

2005 West Coast Conference baseball standings
	Conf.						Overall
Team	W		L		T	PCT	W		L		T	PCT
West
No. 23 Pepperdine ^{x‡y} ‍‍‍	21	–	9	–	0	.700	41	–	23	–	0	.641
San Francisco ‍‍‍	16	–	14	–	0	.533	38	–	18	–	0	.679
Santa Clara ‍‍‍	11	–	19	–	0	.367	28	–	28	–	0	.500
Portland ‍‍‍	7	–	23	–	0	.233	17	–	36	–	0	.321
Coast
Loyola Marymount ^{x}‍‍‍	18	–	12	–	0	.600	31	–	27	–	0	.534
San Diego ‍‍‍	16	–	14	–	0	.533	30	–	27	–	1	.526
Gonzaga ‍‍‍	15	–	15	–	0	.500	28	–	26	–	0	.519
Saint Mary's ‍‍‍	12	–	18	–	0	.400	20	–	30	–	0	.400
x – Division champion ‡ – Championship Series champion y – Invited to the NCAA tournament As of June 30, 2005; Rankings from Collegiate Baseball

The 2005 West Coast Conference Baseball Championship Series was held on May 27 through 29, 2005 at Loyola Marymount's home stadium, George C. Page Stadium in Los Angeles, California, and pitted the winners of the conference's two four-team divisions. The event determined the champion of the West Coast Conference for the 2005 NCAA Division I baseball season. Pepperdine won the series two games to one over Loyola Marymount and earned the league's automatic bid to the 2005 NCAA Division I baseball tournament.

== Seeding ==
Team	W–L	Pct	GB
West Division
Pepperdine	21–9	.700	—
San Francisco	16–14	.533	5
Santa Clara	11–19	.367	10
Portland	7–23	.233	14

Team	W–L–T	Pct	GB
Coast Division
Loyola Marymount	18–12	.600	—
San Diego	16–14	.533	2
Gonzaga	15–15	.500	3
Saint Mary's	12–18	.400	6

== Results ==
Game One

May 27, 2005
Team	R
Pepperdine	3
Loyola Marymount	7

Game Two

May 28, 2005
Team	R
Loyola Marymount	5
Pepperdine	7

Game Three

May 29, 2005
Team	R
Pepperdine	18
Loyola Marymount	8
