= 2004 West Coast Conference Baseball Championship Series =

2004 West Coast Conference baseball tournament
- Teams: 4
- Format: Double-elimination
- Finals site: Eddy D. Field Stadium; Malibu, California
- Champions: Pepperdine (2nd title)
- Winning coach: Steve Rodriguez (1st title)

2004 West Coast Conference baseball standings
	Conf.						Overall
Team	W		L		T	PCT	W		L		T	PCT
West
Pepperdine ^{x}‍‍‡‍^{y}	19	–	11	–	0	.633	30	–	32	–	0	.484
Santa Clara ‍‍‍	16	–	14	–	0	.533	27	–	29	–	0	.482
San Francisco ‍‍‍	14	–	16	–	0	.467	27	–	32	–	0	.458
Portland ‍‍‍	6	–	24	–	0	.200	12	–	44	–	0	.214
Coast
Loyola Marymount ^{x} ‍‍‍	20	–	7	–	0	.741	32	–	22	–	1	.591
San Diego ‍‍‍	19	–	11	–	0	.633	35	–	21	–	0	.625
Gonzaga ‍‍‍	16	–	11	–	0	.593	24	–	27	–	0	.471
Saint Mary's ‍‍‍	7	–	23	–	0	.233	14	–	41	–	0	.255
x – Division champion ‡ – Championship Series champion y – Invited to the NCAA tournament As of June 30, 2004; Rankings from Collegiate Baseball

The 2004 West Coast Conference Baseball Championship Series was held on May 28 and 29, 2004 at Loyola Marymount's home stadium, George C. Page Stadium in Los Angeles, California, and pitted the winners of the conference's two four-team divisions. The event determined the champion of the West Coast Conference for the 2004 NCAA Division I baseball season. Pepperdine won the series two games to none over Loyola Marymount and earned the league's automatic bid to the 2004 NCAA Division I baseball tournament.

== Seeding ==
Team	W–L	Pct	GB
West Division
Pepperdine	19–11	.633	—
Santa Clara	16–14	.533	3
San Francisco	14–16	.467	5
Portland	6–24	.200	13

Team	W–L–T	Pct	GB
Coast Division
Loyola Marymount	20–7	.741	—
San Diego	19–11	.633	2.5
Gonzaga	16–11	.593	4
Saint Mary's	7–23	.233	14.5

== Results ==
Game One

May 28, 2004
Team	R
Pepperdine	5
Loyola Marymount	1

Game Two

May 29, 2004
Team	R
Loyola Marymount	10
Pepperdine	12
