= 2006 West Coast Conference Baseball Championship Series =

2006 West Coast Conference baseball tournament
- Teams: 4
- Format: Double-elimination
- Finals site: Dante Benedetti Diamond at Max Ulrich Field; San Francisco, California
- Champions: Pepperdine (4th title)
- Winning coach: Steve Rodriguez (3rd title)

2006 West Coast Conference baseball standings
	Conf.				Overall
Team	W		L	PCT	W		L	PCT
No. 30 Pepperdine ‍†‍‡‍^{y}	15	–	6	.714	42	–	21	.667
San Francisco ‍†‍‍^{y}	15	–	6	.714	39	–	23	.629
San Diego ‍‍‍^{y}	13	–	8	.619	33	–	25	.569
Loyola Marymount ‍‍‍	11	–	10	.524	24	–	32	.429
Gonzaga ‍‍‍	9	–	12	.429	29	–	24	.547
Santa Clara ‍‍‍	9	–	12	.429	28	–	26	.519
Saint Mary's ‍‍‍	9	–	12	.429	26	–	25	.510
Portland ‍‍‍	3	–	18	.143	15	–	37	.288
† – Conference champion ‡ – Championship Series champion y – Invited to the NCAA tournament As of June 30, 2006; Rankings from Collegiate Baseball

The 2006 West Coast Conference Baseball Championship Series was held on May 26 through 28, 2006 at San Francisco's home stadium, Dante Benedetti Diamond at Max Ulrich Field in San Francisco, California, and pitted the top two finishers from the WCC regular season. The event determined the champion of the West Coast Conference for the 2006 NCAA Division I baseball season. Pepperdine won the series two games to one over San Francisco and earned the league's automatic bid to the 2006 NCAA Division I baseball tournament.

== Seeding ==
Team	W–L	Pct	GB
Pepperdine	15–6	.714	—
San Francisco	15–6	.714	—
San Diego	13–8	.619	2
Loyola Marymount	11–10	.524	4
Gonzaga	9–12	.429	6
Santa Clara	9–12	.429	6
Saint Mary's	9–12	.429	6
Portland	3–18	.143	12

== Results ==
Game One

May 26, 2006
Team	R
Pepperdine	6
San Francisco	7

Game Two

May 27, 2006
Team	R
San Francisco	0
Pepperdine	11

Game Three

May 28, 2006
Team	R
Pepperdine	9
San Francisco	4
