= 2000 West Coast Conference Baseball Championship Series =

2000 West Coast Conference baseball tournament
- Teams: 4
- Format: Double-elimination
- Finals site: George C. Page Stadium; Los Angeles
- Champions: Loyola Marymount (2nd title)
- Winning coach: Frank Cruz (2nd title)

2000 West Coast Conference baseball standings
	Conf.						Overall
Team	W		L		T	PCT	W		L		T	PCT
West
Pepperdine ^{x}‍‍‍	22	–	8	–	0	.733	36	–	23	–	0	.610
San Diego ‍‍‍	14	–	16	–	0	.467	34	–	27	–	1	.556
Portland ‍‍‍	13	–	17	–	0	.433	24	–	28	–	0	.462
Saint Mary's ‍‍‍	10	–	20	–	0	.333	20	–	34	–	0	.370
Coast
#24 Loyola Marymount ^{x‡y} ‍‍‍	22	–	8	–	0	.733	40	–	19	–	0	.678
Gonzaga ‍‍‍	17	–	13	–	0	.567	28	–	25	–	0	.528
Santa Clara ‍‍‍	12	–	18	–	0	.400	22	–	37	–	0	.373
San Francisco ‍‍‍	10	–	20	–	0	.333	26	–	33	–	0	.441
x – Division champion ‡ – Championship Series champion y – Invited to the NCAA tournament As of June 30, 2000; Rankings from Collegiate Baseball

The 2000 West Coast Conference Baseball Championship Series was held on May 19 and 20, 2000 at Loyola Marymount's home stadium, George C. Page Stadium in Los Angeles, California, and pitted the winners of the conference's two four-team divisions. The event determined the champion of the West Coast Conference for the 2000 NCAA Division I baseball season. Loyola Marymount won the series two games to none over Pepperdine and earned the league's automatic bid to the 2000 NCAA Division I baseball tournament.

== Seeding ==
Team	W–L	Pct	GB
West Division
Pepperdine	22–8	.733	—
San Diego	14–16	.467	8
Portland	13–17	.433	9
Saint Mary's	10–20	.333	12

Team	W–L–T	Pct	GB
Coast Division
Loyola Marymount	22–8	.733	—
Gonzaga	17–13	.567	5
Santa Clara	12–18	.400	10
San Francisco	10–20	.333	12

== Results ==
Game One

May 19, 2000
Team	R
Pepperdine	5
Loyola Marymount	19

Game Two

May 20, 2000
Team	R
Loyola Marymount	6
Pepperdine	2
