= 1999 West Coast Conference Baseball Championship Series =

1999 West Coast Conference baseball tournament
- Teams: 4
- Format: Double-elimination
- Finals site: Campus Sites
- Champions: Loyola Marymount (1st title)
- Winning coach: Frank Cruz (1st title)

1999 West Coast Conference baseball standings
	Conf.						Overall
Team	W		L		T	PCT	W		L		T	PCT
West
No. 19 Pepperdine ^{x}‍‍‍^{y}	21	–	9	–	0	.700	46	–	16	–	0	.742
Gonzaga ‍‍‍	14	–	14	–	1	.500	27	–	23	–	2	.538
San Diego ‍‍‍	13	–	16	–	1	.450	28	–	27	–	1	.509
San Francisco ‍‍‍	11	–	18	–	0	.379	21	–	35	–	1	.377
Coast
Loyola Marymount ^{x‡y} ‍‍‍	18	–	12	–	0	.600	33	–	28	–	0	.541
Portland ‍‍‍	16	–	14	–	0	.533	23	–	28	–	0	.451
Saint Mary's ‍‍‍	14	–	16	–	0	.467	22	–	32	–	0	.407
Santa Clara ‍‍‍	11	–	19	–	0	.367	20	–	36	–	0	.357
x – Division champion ‡ – Championship Series champion y – Invited to the NCAA tournament As of June 30, 1999; Rankings from Collegiate Baseball

The 1999 West Coast Conference Baseball Championship Series was held on May 21 and 22, 1999 at alternating campus sites, and pitted the winners of the conference's two four-team divisions. The event determined the champion of the West Coast Conference for the 1999 NCAA Division I baseball season. Loyola Marymount won the series two games to one over Pepperdine and earned the league's automatic bid to the 1999 NCAA Division I baseball tournament.

== Seeding ==
Team	W–L–T	Pct	GB
West Division
Pepperdine	21–9–0	.700	—
Gonzaga	14–14–1	.500	6
San Diego	13–16–1	.450	7.5
San Francisco	11–18–0	.379	9.5

Team	W–L–T	Pct	GB
Coast Division
Loyola Marymount	18–12–0	.600	—
Portland	16–14–0	.533	2
Saint Mary's	14–16–0	.467	4
Santa Clara	11–19–0	.367	7

== Results ==
Game One

May 21, 1999
Team	R
Pepperdine	2
Loyola Marymount	3

Game Two

May 22, 1999
Team	R
Loyola Marymount	2
Pepperdine	18

Game Three

May 22, 1999
Team	R
Pepperdine	6
Loyola Marymount	7
