= Greg Moore (baseball) =

American baseball coach (born 1977)

Biographical details
- Born: July 6, 1977 (age 49); Long Beach, California, U.S.

Playing career
- 1997: Long Beach CC
- 1999–2001: San Francisco
- Position: Pitcher/Catcher

Coaching career (HC unless noted)
- 2002–2009: San Francisco (asst.)
- 2010: Washington (asst.)
- 2011–2013: San Francisco (asst.)
- 2014–2019: Cal State Northridge
- 2020–2023: Saint Mary's

Head coaching record
- Overall: 241–267 (.474)

Gregory Steven Moore (born July 6, 1977) is an American college baseball coach and former catcher and pitcher. Moore was previously the head baseball coach at Saint Mary's College of California. Moore played college baseball at Long Beach City College and the University of San Francisco. He served as head coach of the Cal State Northridge Matadors baseball team from 2014 to 2019.

Moore was a pitcher and catcher, first for Long Beach City College then San Francisco. Following his playing career, he became an assistant for the Dons and served as recruiting coordinator. He served one year as a pitching coach at Washington before returning to San Francisco as associate head coach. He earned his first head coaching job at Cal State Northridge prior to the 2014 season. With a 161–175 record in six seasons, Moore was fired from his head coaching position at Cal State Northridge.

On June 15, 2019, Moore was hired as the head coach of the Saint Mary's. After the 2023 season, Moore was fired by Saint Mary's College.

== Head coaching record ==
The following is a table of Moore's yearly records as an NCAA head coach.

Record table
Season	Team	Overall	Conference	Standing	Postseason
Cal State Northridge Matadors (Big West Conference) (2014–2019)
2014	Cal State Northridge	18–38	6–18	T–8th	
2015	Cal State Northridge	33–24	8–16	8th	
2016	Cal State Northridge	33–22	11–13	T–7th	
2017	Cal State Northridge	26–29	12–12	4th	
2018	Cal State Northridge	28–30	13–11	T–3rd	
2019	Cal State Northridge	23–32	9–15	T–5th	
Cal State Northridge:		161–175 (.479)	59–85 (.410)		
Saint Mary's Gaels (West Coast Conference) (2020–2023)
2020	Saint Mary's	8–8	0–0		Season canceled due to COVID-19
2021	Saint Mary's	25–26	11–16	8th	
2022	Saint Mary's	25–30	9–18	9th	
2023	Saint Mary's	23-28	14-13		
Saint Mary's Gaels:		80–92 (.465)	34–47 (.420)		
Total:		239–260 (.479)			
