= Fowler Park =

Baseball venue

Fowler Park and Cunningham Field
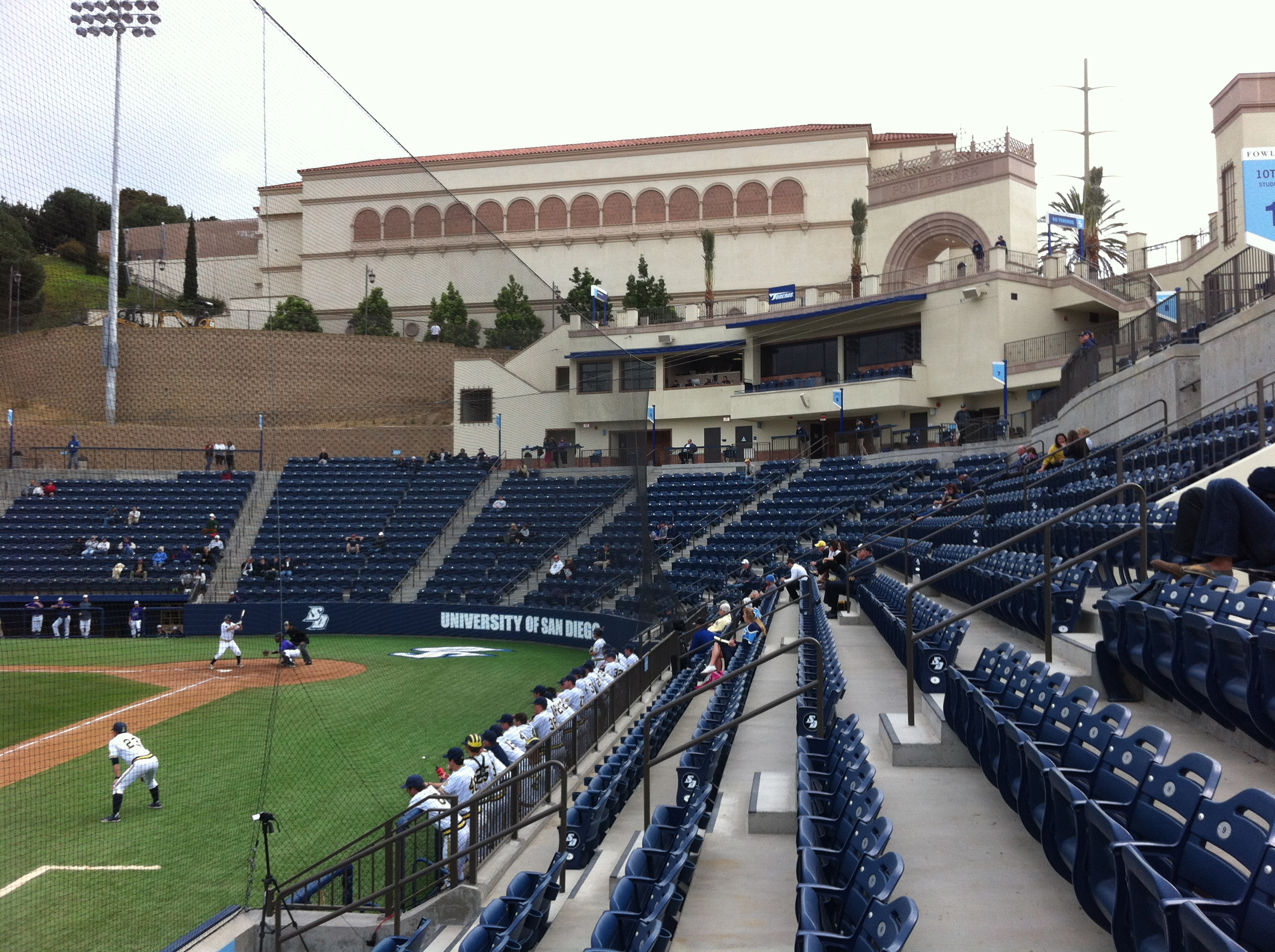
- Interactive map of Fowler Park and Cunningham Field
- Address: 5998 Torero Way
- Location: San Diego, California
- Coordinates: 32.776°N 117.183°W
- Owner: University of San Diego
- Operator: University of San Diego
- Capacity: 1,700 (expandable to 3,000)
- Surface: Bermuda grass (infield/Outfield), Synthetic turf (Foul areas from third base to first base); Crushed red brick (Infield dirt)
- Scoreboard: Electronic
- Field size: 312 ft. (LF), 370 ft. (LCF), 391 ft. (CF), 385 ft. (RCF), 327 ft. (RF)

Construction
- Groundbreaking: May 2012
- Opened: February 15, 2013
- Cost: $13 million USD
- Architect: Populous

Tenant
- San Diego Toreros (NCAA) (2013–present)

Fowler Park (officially Fowler Park and Cunningham Field) is a ballpark in San Diego, California, located on the campus of the University of San Diego (USD). Opened in 2013, it is the home of the San Diego Toreros baseball team. The Toreros compete in NCAA Division I as a member of the West Coast Conference (WCC).

== History and features ==
The stadium is located on the site of former John Cunningham Stadium, which was demolished in 2012. The new field is named after former San Diego baseball coach John Cunningham. Cunningham was the Torero head coach for 34 seasons. The new stadium is named after Ron and Alexis Fowler, who provided a substantial portion of the $13 million needed to build the ballpark.

The capacity is expandable to 3,000 spectators for postseason or special event play.

Fowler Park opened on February 15, 2013, hosting a 3-game series between University of San Diego and their cross town opponents from San Diego State University.

Fowler Park features a grand entry archway detailed in 16th century Spanish Renaissance architecture. The McGee Family Entry Deck which gives spectators views of the entire ballpark. The ballpark features a 25'x16' digital ICG scoreboard. There are two luxury suites with indoor/outdoor seating, a press box area for radio/TV/game operations, public restrooms, concessions, and a ticket office. The Torero Deck, which sits on top of the clubhouse, features a synthetic turf miniature baseball field.

== See also ==
- List of NCAA Division I baseball venues
