= Rich Hill (baseball coach) =

American baseball coach (born 1962)

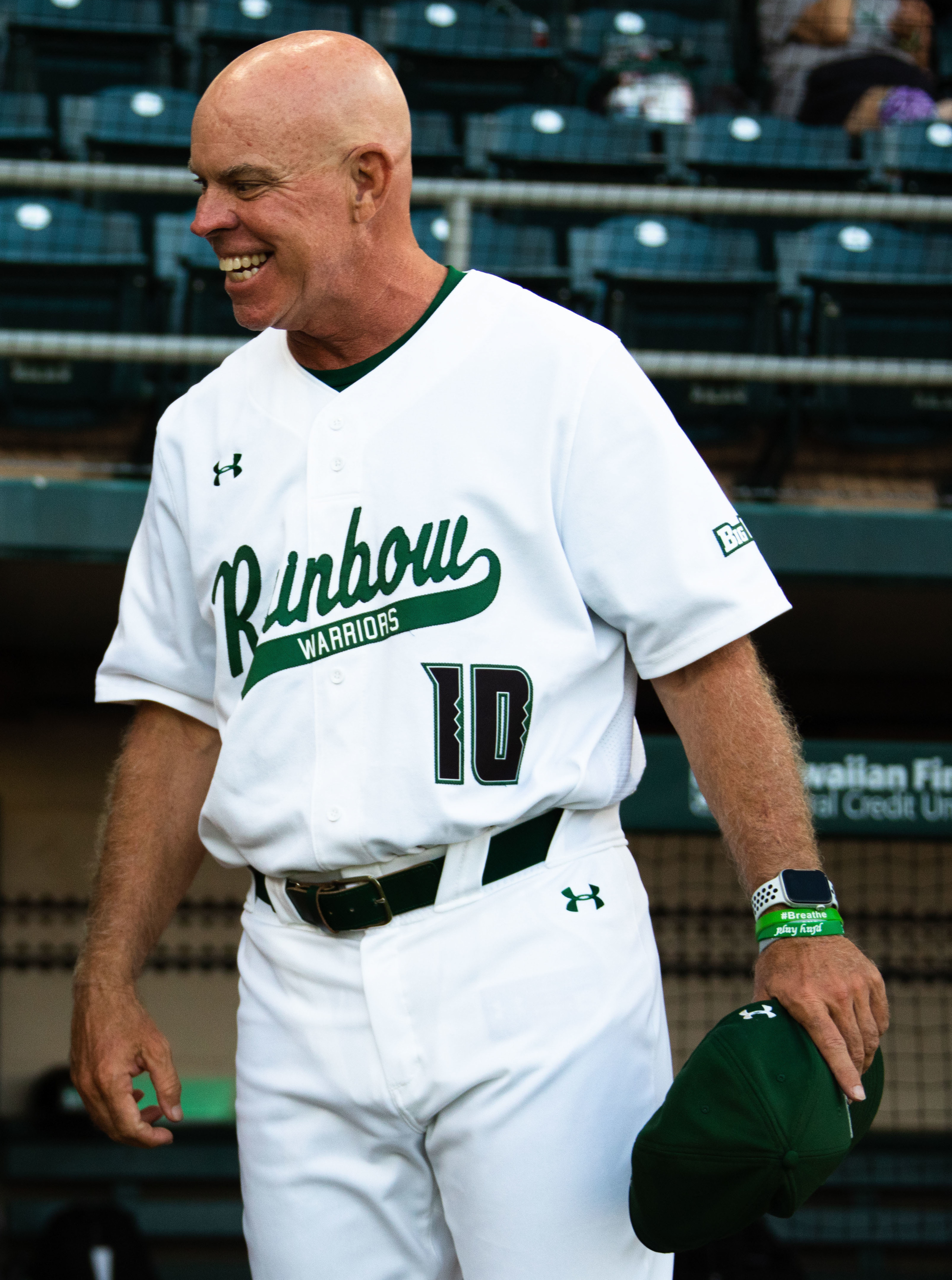
- Hill in 2022

Current position
- Title: Head coach
- Team: Hawai'i
- Conference: Mountain West
- Record: 129–81 (.614)

Biographical details
- Born: June 30, 1962 (age 64); San Diego, California, U.S.
- Education: California Lutheran University

Playing career
- 1981–1982: San Diego State
- 1983–1985: Cal Lutheran
- Position: Second baseman

Coaching career (HC unless noted)
- 1988–1993: Cal Lutheran
- 1994–1998: San Francisco
- 1999–2021: San Diego
- 2022–present: Hawai'i

Head coaching record
- Overall: 1,208–819–4 (.596)

Accomplishments and honors

Championships
- 2× Southern California Intercollegiate Athletic Conference Championships (1992, 1993): 2× Division III College World Series appearances (1992, 1993); 2× West Coast Conference West Division Regular season Championships (2002, 2003); 4× West Coast Conference Regular season Championships (2007, 2008, 2010, 2015); 4× West Coast Conference Championship Series Titles (2002, 2003, 2007, 2008); West Coast Conference Tournament Title (2013)

Awards
- 1 Cape Cod Baseball League Manager of the Year Award (1992); 2 Southern California Intercollegiate Athletic Conference Coach of the year Awards (1992, 1993); 2 ABCA West Region Coach of the Year Awards (1992, 1993); 2 California Lutheran Alumni Career Excellence Awards (1993, 1994)

Richard Bradley Hill (born June 30, 1962) is an American baseball coach who is the current head baseball coach of the Hawaii Rainbow Warriors.

== Biography ==
Hill played college baseball briefly at San Diego State before transferring to Cal Lutheran to finish his college career. He played one season of professional baseball (1985) with the Class-A Savannah Cardinals as a second baseman.

Hill was the head coach of the Cal Lutheran Kingsmen from 1988 to 1993 and the San Francisco Dons from 1994 to 1998. He was then the head coach of the San Diego Toreros from 1999 to 2021. Hill's career head coaching record was 715–481–3, through the 2011 season. He has served as the head baseball coach for the Hawaii Rainbow Warriors since the 2022 season.

Hill also managed the Chatham A's, a collegiate summer baseball team in the Cape Cod Baseball League, from 1990 to 1993.

Hill and his wife Lori have two children, including Trevor Bauer accuser Lindsey Hill.

== Head coaching record ==
Below is a table of Hill's yearly records as an NAIA and NCAA head baseball coach.

Record table
Season	Team	Overall	Conference	Standing	Postseason
Cal Lutheran Kingsmen (NAIA) (1988–1991)
1988	Cal Lutheran	20–23			
1989	Cal Lutheran	31–18			
1990	Cal Lutheran	35–16			District Champions
1991	Cal Lutheran	32–8			
Cal Lutheran Kingsmen (SCIAC (Division III)) (1992–1993)
1992	Cal Lutheran	43–6	20–1	1st	D-III Runner-Up
1993	Cal Lutheran	32–9	19–2	1st	D-III National Final
Cal Lutheran:		193–80	39–3		
San Francisco Dons (West Coast Conference) (1994–1998)
1994	San Francisco	22–33	9–21	6th	
1995	San Francisco	24–35	11–17	5th	
1996	San Francisco	30–25	15–13	4th	
1997	San Francisco	29–27	17–11	3rd	
1998	San Francisco	34–24	18–12	T–3rd	
San Francisco:		139–144	70–74		
San Diego Toreros (West Coast Conference) (1999–2021)
1999	San Diego	28–27–1	13–16–1	3rd (West)	
2000	San Diego	34–27–1	14–16	2nd (West)	
2001	San Diego	35–21	20–10	2nd (West)	
2002	San Diego	39–23	18–12	1st (West)	NCAA Regional
2003	San Diego	32–30	18–12	1st (West)	NCAA Regional
2004	San Diego	35–21	19–11	2nd (Coast)	
2005	San Diego	30–27–1	16–14	2nd (Coast)	
2006	San Diego	33–25	13–8	3rd	NCAA Regional
2007	San Diego	43–18	18–3	1st	NCAA Regional
2008	San Diego	44–17	16–5	1st	NCAA Regional
2009	San Diego	29–25	11–10	5th	
2010	San Diego	37–22	19–2	1st	NCAA Regional
2011	San Diego	22–31	11–10	T–3rd	
2012	San Diego	40–17	15–9	2nd	NCAA Regional
2013	San Diego	37–25	15–9	T–2nd	NCAA Regional
2014	San Diego	34–20	16–11	T–4th	
2015	San Diego	33–22	19–8	1st	West Coast tournament
2016	San Diego	27–29	13–14	T–6th	
2017	San Diego	35–18–1	18–9	T–4th	
2018	San Diego	23–32	12–15	T–6th	
2019	San Diego	32–21	14–13	T–6th	
2020	San Diego	12–4	0–0		Season canceled due to the COVID-19 pandemic
2021	San Diego	33–12	19–8	2nd	
San Diego:		747–514–4	347–225–1		
Hawai'i Rainbow Warriors (Big West Conference) (2022–present)
2022	Hawai'i	28–24	19–11	3rd	
2023	Hawai'i	29–20	18–12	T–5th	
2024	Hawai'i	37–16	20–10	T–3rd	
2025	Hawai'i	35–21	16–14	T–4th	
Hawai'i:		129–81	73–47		
Total:		1,208–819–4			
National champion Postseason invitational champion Conference regular season champion Conference regular season and conference tournament champion Division regular season champion Division regular season and conference tournament champion Conference tournament champion

== See also ==
- List of current NCAA Division I baseball coaches
- List of college baseball career coaching wins leaders
