= John Cunningham Stadium =

Ballpark in San Diego, California

- Cunningham Stadium
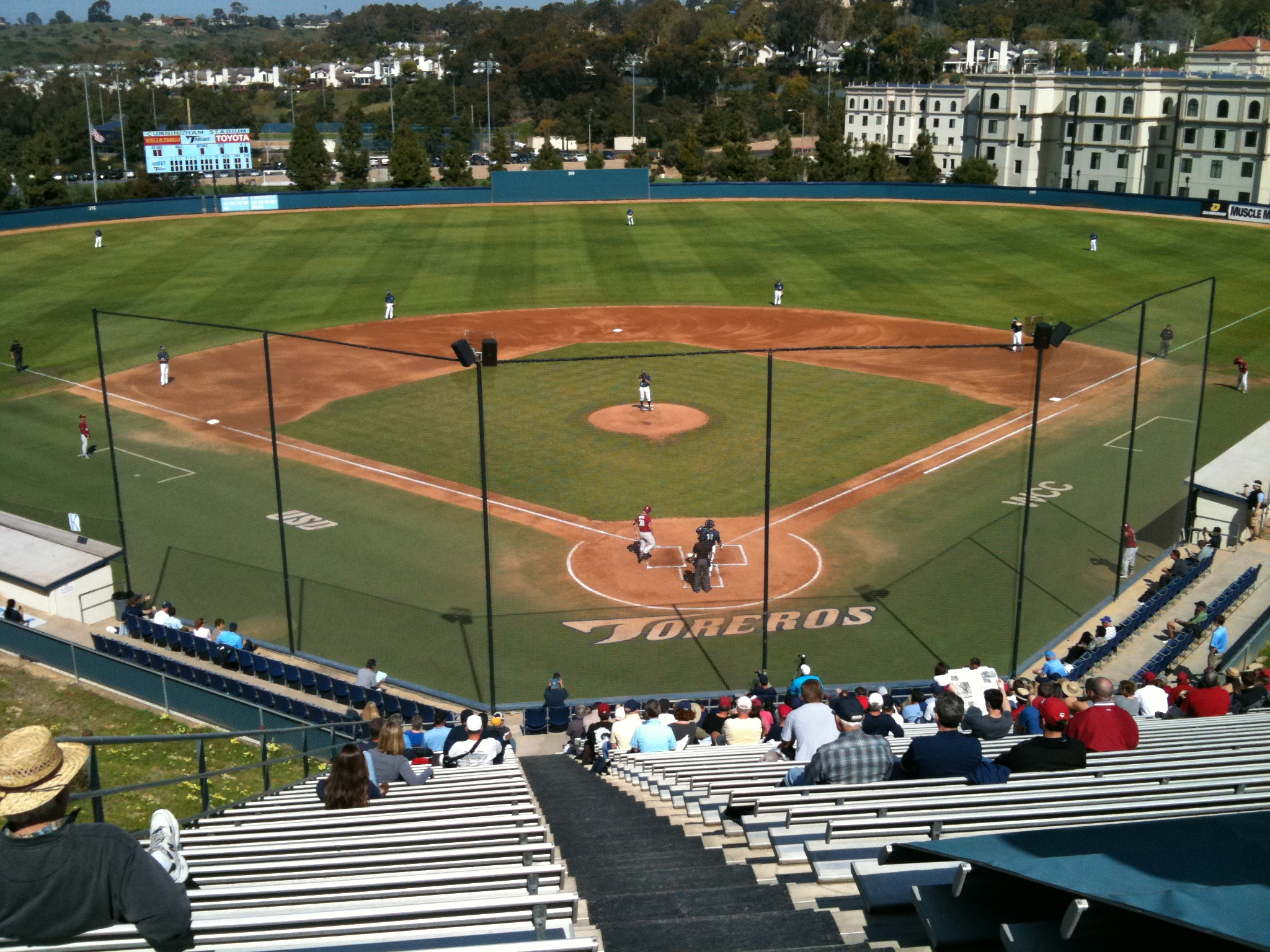
- Interactive map of John Cunningham Stadium
- Location: San Diego, California
- Coordinates: 32.775325°N 117.183711°W
- Owner: University of San Diego
- Operator: University of San Diego
- Capacity: 1,200
- Surface: Bermuda grass (infield/outfield), Synthetic turf (Foul areas from third base to first base), Crushed red brick (Infield dirt)
- Scoreboard: Yes
- Field size: 309 ft. (LF), 375 ft. (LCF), 395 ft. (CF), 385 ft. (RCF), 329 ft. (RF)

Construction
- Built: 1970
- Renovated: 2003
- Closed: 2012
- Demolished: 2012

Tenant
- San Diego Toreros (NCAA) (1970–2012)

John Cunningham Stadium was a ballpark in San Diego, California, located on the campus of the University of San Diego (USD). It was the home of the San Diego Toreros baseball team.

== History ==
The park was built in 1970 and renovated in 2003. Renovations included the additions of synthetic turf in foul territory, a press box, and a public address system. The field had a capacity of 1,200 seats, all chair-backed.

The stadium was dedicated in 1988 for former San Diego baseball coach John Cunningham. Cunningham was the Torero head coach for 34 seasons.

John Cunningham Stadium was demolished and replaced by a new venue after the 2012 season. The new ballpark, Fowler Park, was built on the same site.
