= Eddy D. Field Stadium =

Baseball stadium in Malibu, California, US

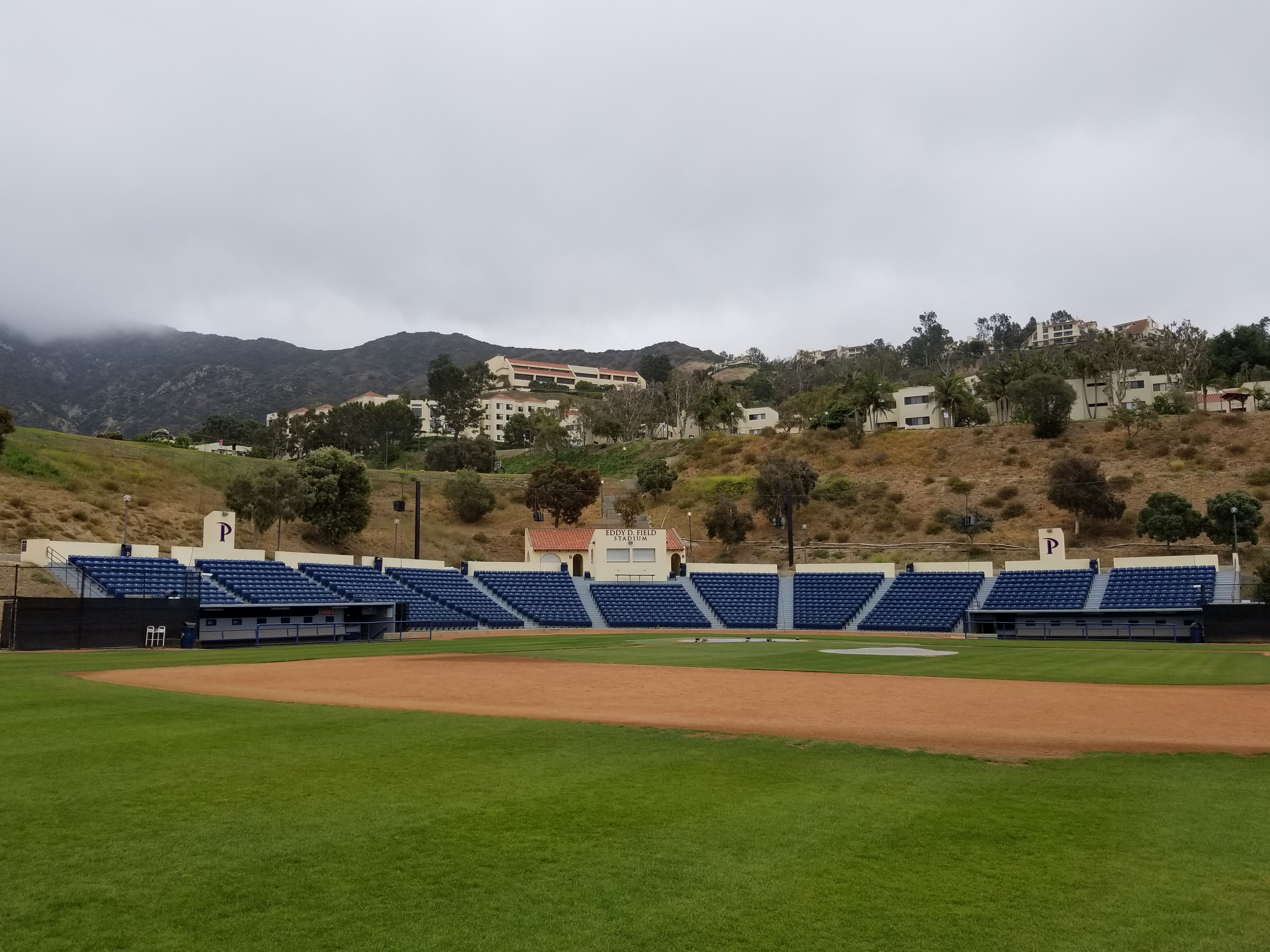
- Interactive map of Eddy D. Field Stadium
- Former names: Waves Field (1973-1980)
- Location: Malibu, California
- Coordinates: 34.040272°N 118.711042°W
- Owner: Pepperdine University
- Operator: Pepperdine University
- Capacity: 1,800
- Surface: Grass
- Field size: Left Field: 330 ft (100 m); Center Field: 400 ft (120 m); Right Field: 330 ft (100 m)

Construction
- Opened: February 16th, 1973
- Renovated: 1980, 1999, 2007

Tenant
- Pepperdine Waves baseball (NCAA) (1973-present)

Website
- Eddy D. Field Stadium

Eddy D. Field Stadium is home of the Pepperdine University Waves' baseball team located in Malibu, California. It was originally built in 1973, but underwent renovations in 1980 and 1999. It now holds up to 2,000 spectators, all box seats. It is well known for its picturesque setting which includes views of the Pacific Ocean, Catalina Island, and the Santa Monica Mountains. College baseball writer Eric Sorenson of CBSSN ranked Eddy D. Field Stadium as the best college baseball stadium in Division I baseball.

== Gallery ==
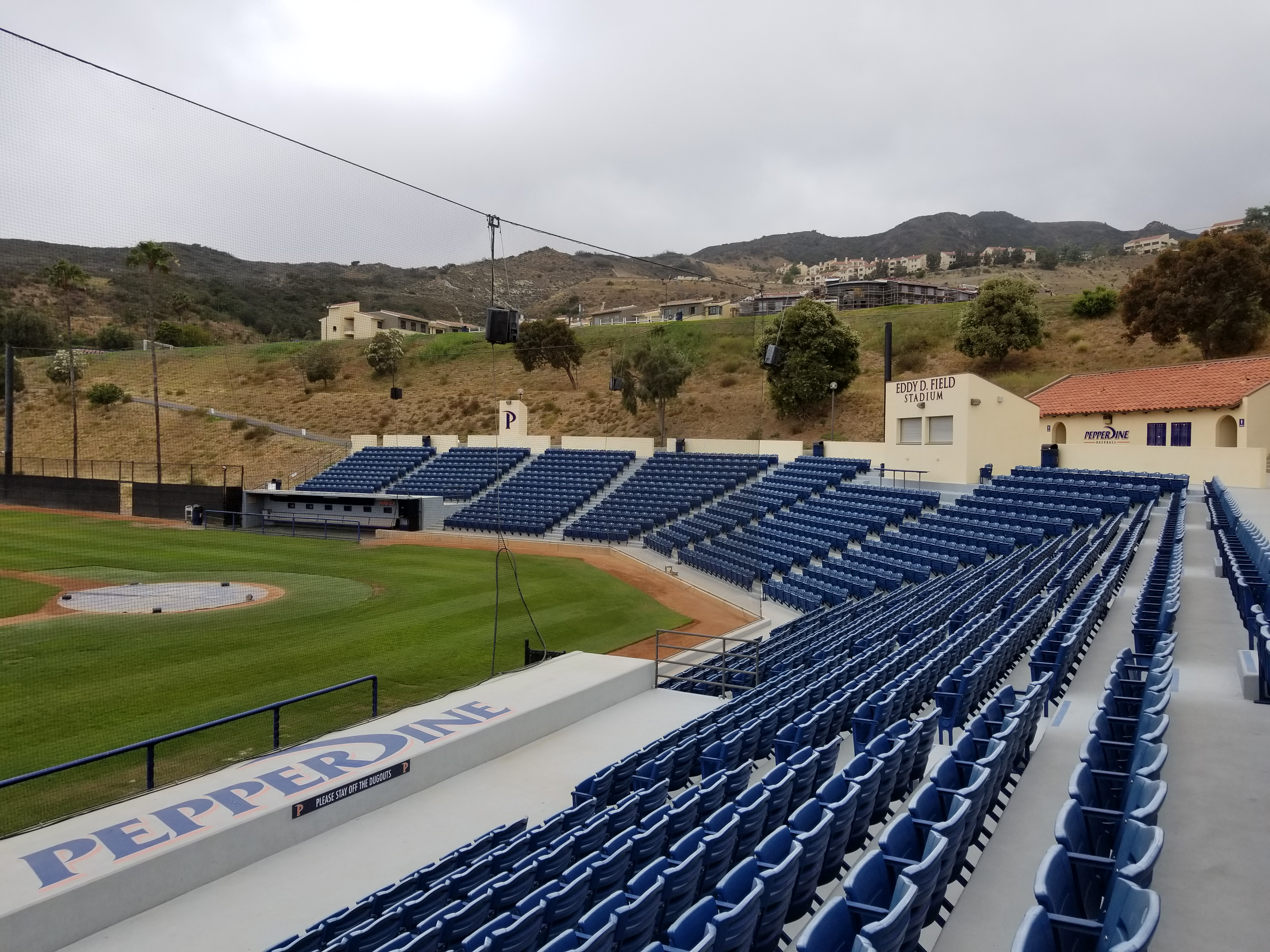
Eddy D. Field Stadium grandstand

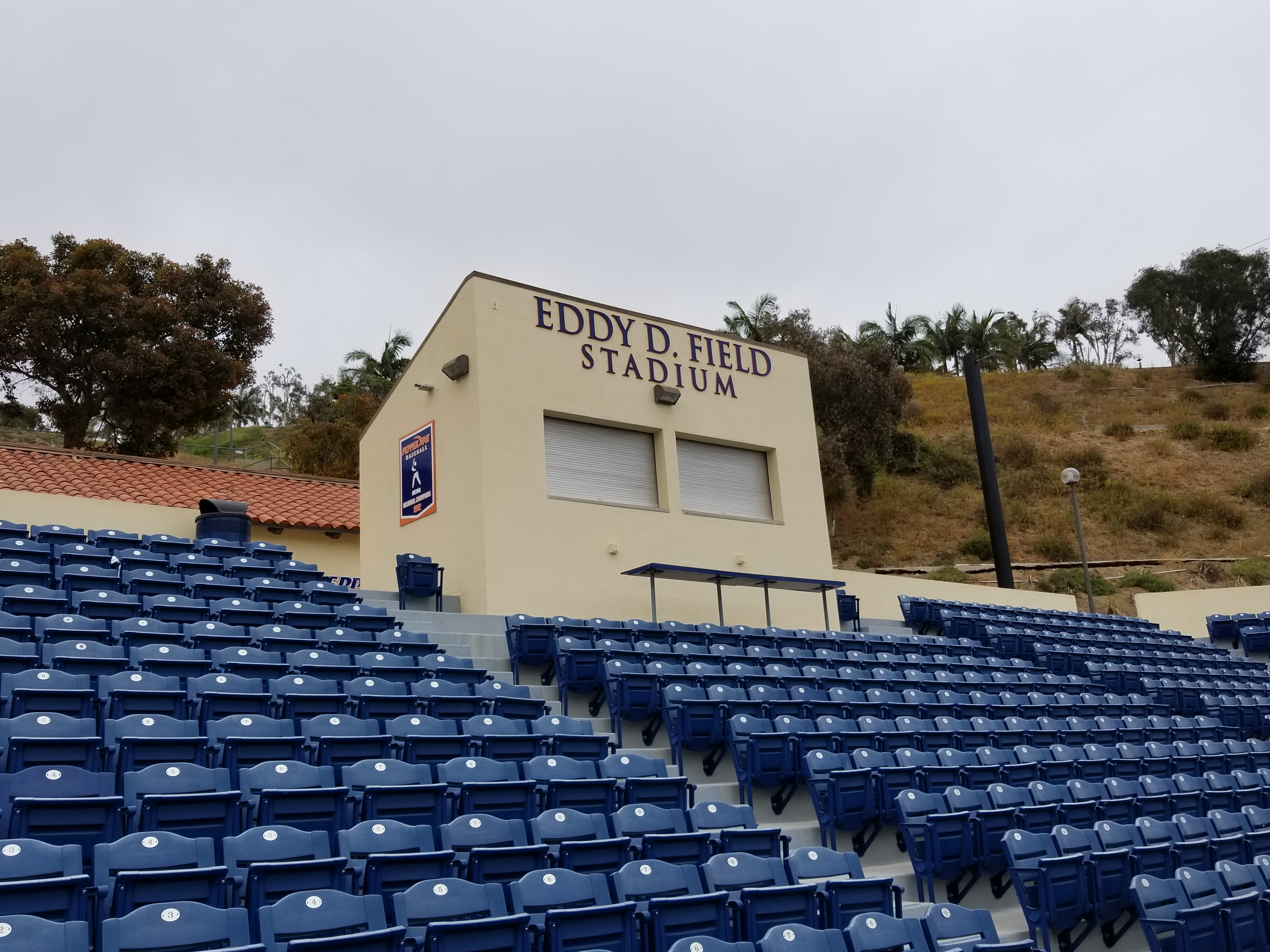
Eddy D. Field Stadium press box

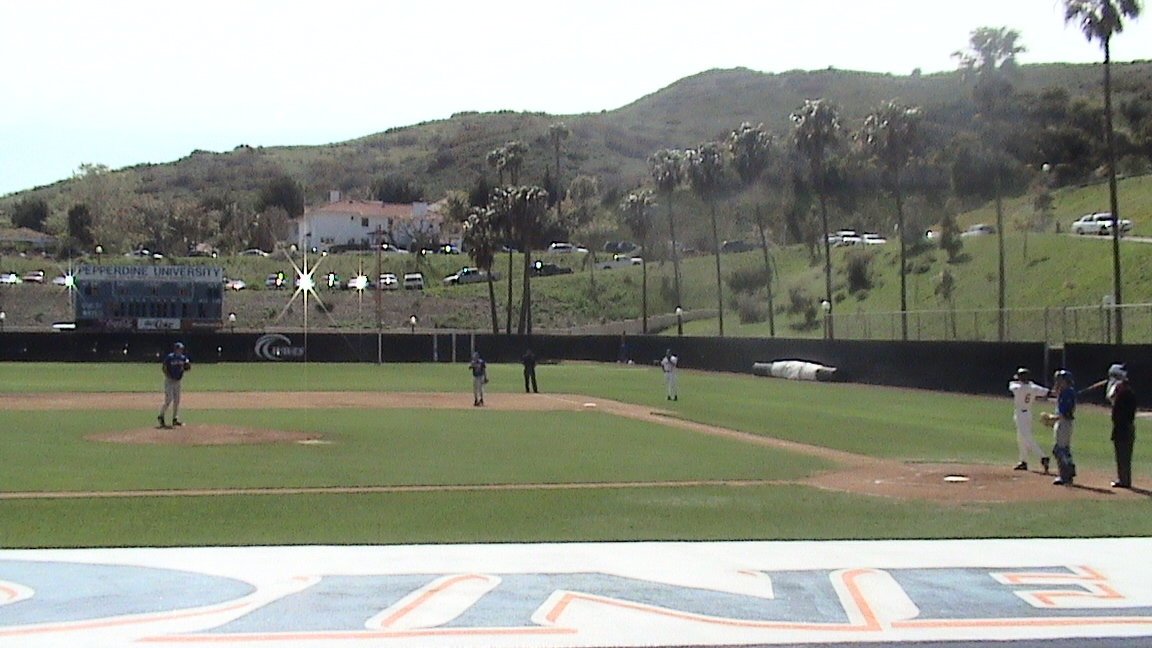
A game at Eddy D. Field Stadium

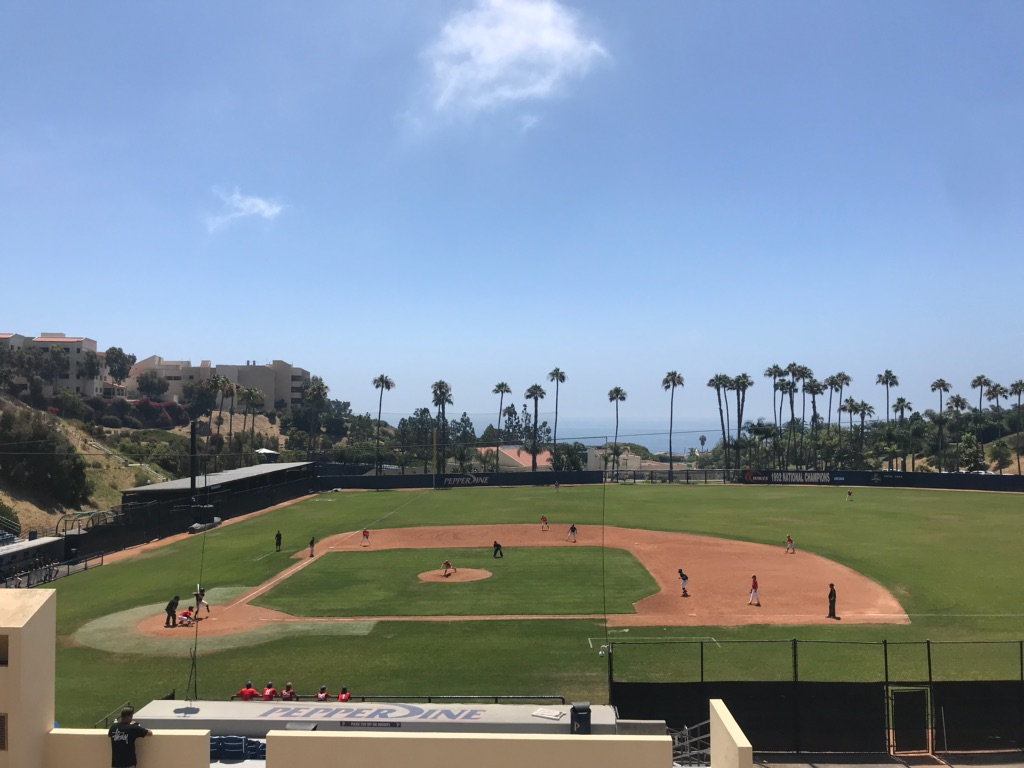
Eddy D. Field Stadium with a view of the Pacific Ocean

== See also ==
- List of NCAA Division I baseball venues
