= San Diego Toreros baseball =

San Diego Toreros
- 2026 San Diego Toreros baseball team
- Founded: 1958
- University: University of San Diego
- Head coach: Brock Ungricht (5th season)
- Conference: West Coast Conference
- Location: San Diego, California
- Home stadium: Fowler Park (capacity: 1,700)
- Nickname: Toreros
- Colors: Navy, white, and Toreros blue

NCAA tournament appearances
- 2002, 2003, 2006, 2007, 2008, 2010, 2012, 2013, 2022, 2024

Conference tournament champions
- 2002, 2003, 2007, 2008, 2013, 2022, 2024

Conference regular season champions
- 2007, 2008, 2010, 2024, 2025; WCC West Division: 2002, 2003

For information on all University of San Diego sports, see San Diego Toreros

The San Diego Toreros baseball team is the college baseball program that represents the University of San Diego (USD). The Toreros compete in NCAA Division I as a member of the West Coast Conference (WCC). The team plays its home games at Fowler Park.

The Toreros have appeared in nine NCAA Division I baseball tournaments. As of 2025, 25 USD alumni have played in Major League Baseball, most notably World Series champion Kris Bryant.

== History ==
The team began play in the 1958 season as an independent school in the NCAA College Division, made up of the athletic programs of small universities and colleges. The school, founded in the early 1950s, was then known as the San Diego College for Men, and its athletic programs were known as the Pioneers. Mike Morrow was the program's head coach for its first six seasons (1958–1963), and the team had an 82–64 record during his tenure. In 1961, the school's athletic programs were renamed the Toreros, for the Roman Catholic school's connections to Spain.

=== John Cunningham era ===
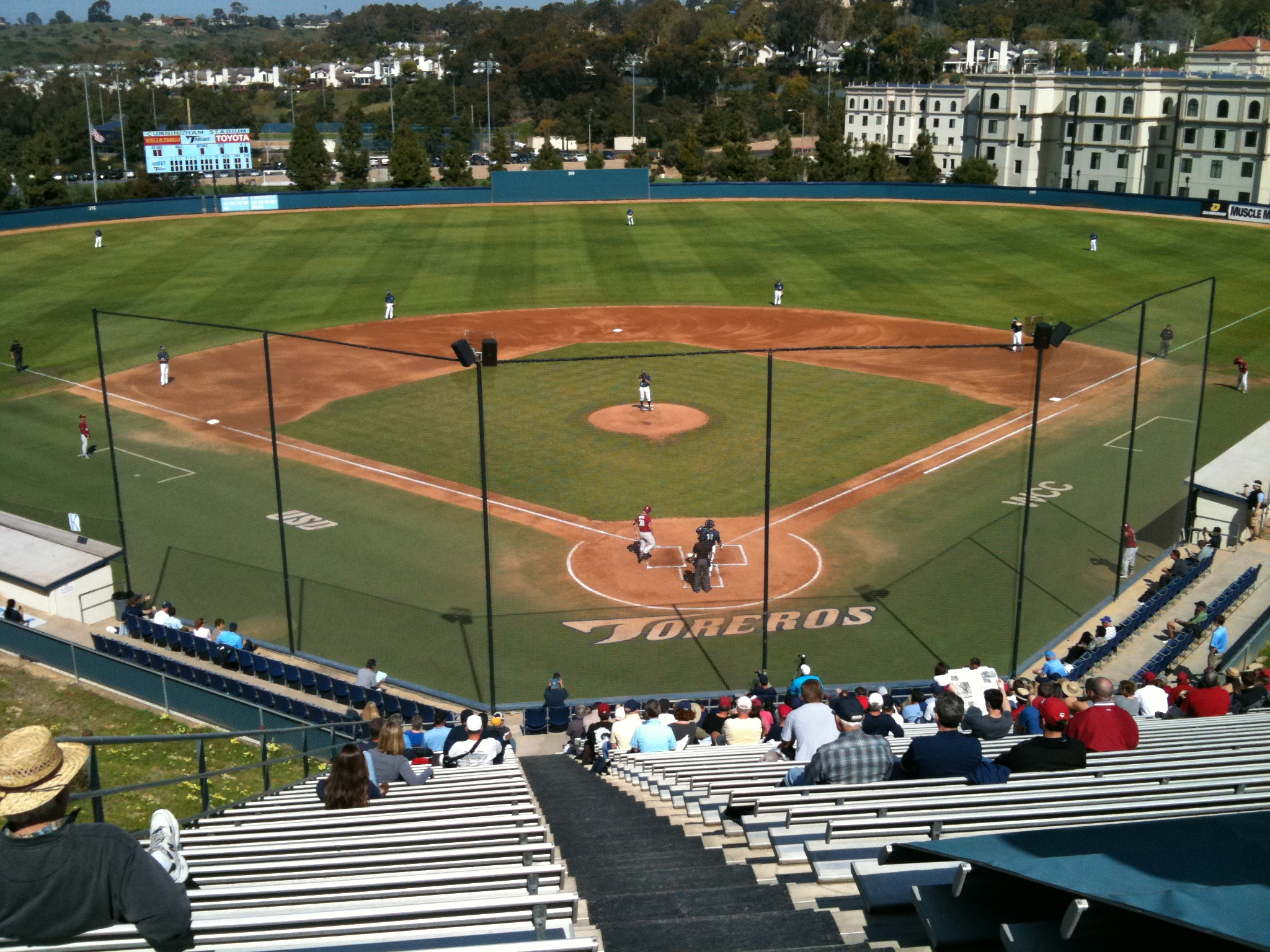
John Cunningham Stadium, the team's home venue from 1970–2012.

In 1964, John Cunningham became the program's second head coach. In 1966, the team joined its first conference, the College Division's Southern California Athletic Conference (SCAC). In four seasons in the conference (1966–1969), the team had a conference record of 25–26–1. Prior to the 1970 season, the Toreros left the SCAC to become a College Division Independent again. Also in 1970, the team began playing in a new venue, which would eventually be dedicated to John Cunningham.

In 1972, the San Diego College for Men merged with the San Diego College for Women to form the University of San Diego.

Through the 1973 season, NCAA institutions had competed in two divisions– the large-school University Division and the small-school College Division. After the 1973 season, however, the NCAA reorganized into its modern, three-division format. The University Division became the modern Division I, while the College Division became Division II and Division III. San Diego, which had previously competed as a College Division Independent, became a Division II Independent.

After five seasons as a Division II Independent, the Toreros transitioned to Division I prior to the 1979 season, joining the Southern California Baseball Association (SCBA). The SCBA, which began play in the 1977 season, was the southern division of a baseball-only merger of the Pacific Coast Athletic Association (PCAC) and the West Coast Athletic Conference (WCAC). The SCBA's counterpart, the Northern California Baseball Association (NCBA), also began play in the 1977 season. San Diego played six seasons in the SCBA, never finishing higher than fourth in the conference.

The SCBA and NCBA stopped operating after the 1984 season, and the PCAC and WCAC returned to sponsoring separate baseball conferences. As a result, San Diego joined the WCAC following the 1985 season. Shortly thereafter (following the 1988 season), the conference was renamed the West Coast Conference (WCC). San Diego struggled in its first several seasons in the league, finishing no higher than fourth from 1985–1991. In 1992 and 1993, however, the Toreros had consecutive second-place finishes and consistently finished highly in the 1990s.

Following the 1998 season, John Cunningham retired after 35 seasons. The team's venue had been renamed John Cunningham Stadium in 1988, and Cunningham retired as San Diego's all-time wins leader with 843 wins. Then-San Francisco head coach Rich Hill was hired to replace Cunningham.

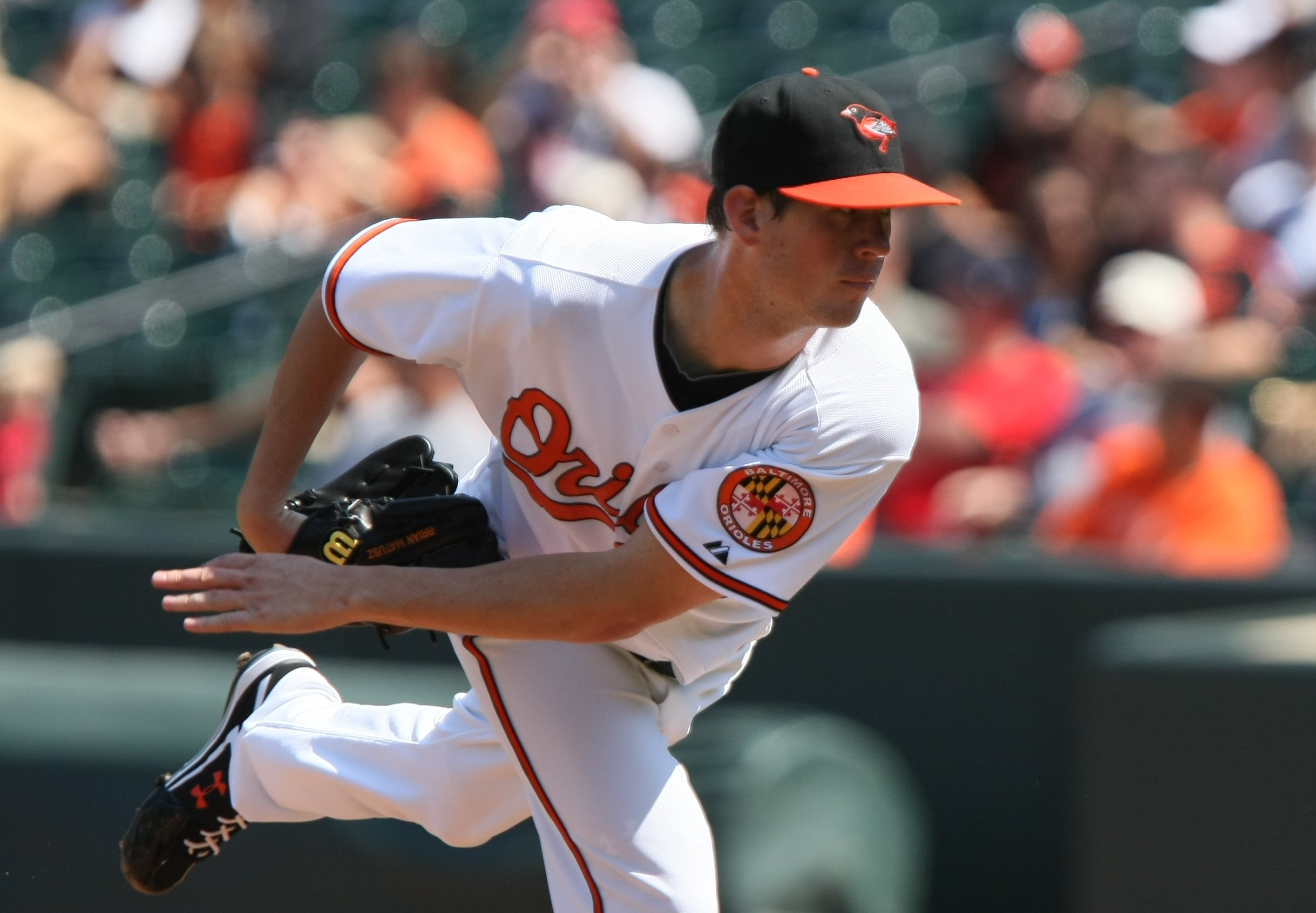
Brian Matusz pitching for MLB's Baltimore Orioles.

=== Rich Hill era ===
In 1999, Rich Hill's first season, the WCC split into two, four-team divisions, the West Division and the Coast Division. The Toreros finished third, second, and second in 1999, 2000, and 2001, respectively. The team then won the West Division and the West Coast Conference Championship Series in both 2002 and 2003, appearing in its first two NCAA tournaments. San Diego again qualified for the tournament in 2006.

In 2007, the Toreros had a 43–18 overall record and an 18–3 WCC record. After winning the WCC Championship Series, the team received a berth in the 2007 NCAA Division I baseball tournament as the #8 National Seed. The team hosted a Regional at crosstown rival San Diego State's home ballpark, Tony Gwynn Stadium, but was eliminated after consecutive losses to Fresno State and Minnesota.

Individually, in both 2007 and 2008, pitcher Brian Matusz was named a First-Team All-American. Matusz is the only San Diego player to be named to the First Team.

The team returned to the NCAA tournament in 2008, 2010, and 2012, but failed to advance out of the Regional round.

On June 18, 2021, Hill resigned from his head coaching position to become the head baseball coach at Hawaii.

=== 2012 MLB draft ===
In the 2012 Major League Baseball draft, the following four Toreros were selected: P Paul Sewald by the New York Mets (10th round), P James Pazos by the New York Yankees (13th round), OF Bryan Haar by the Minnesota Twins (34th round), and P Calvin Drummond by the Oakland Athletics (38th round). Sewald, Pazos, and Haar signed professional contracts.

=== Brock Ungricht era ===
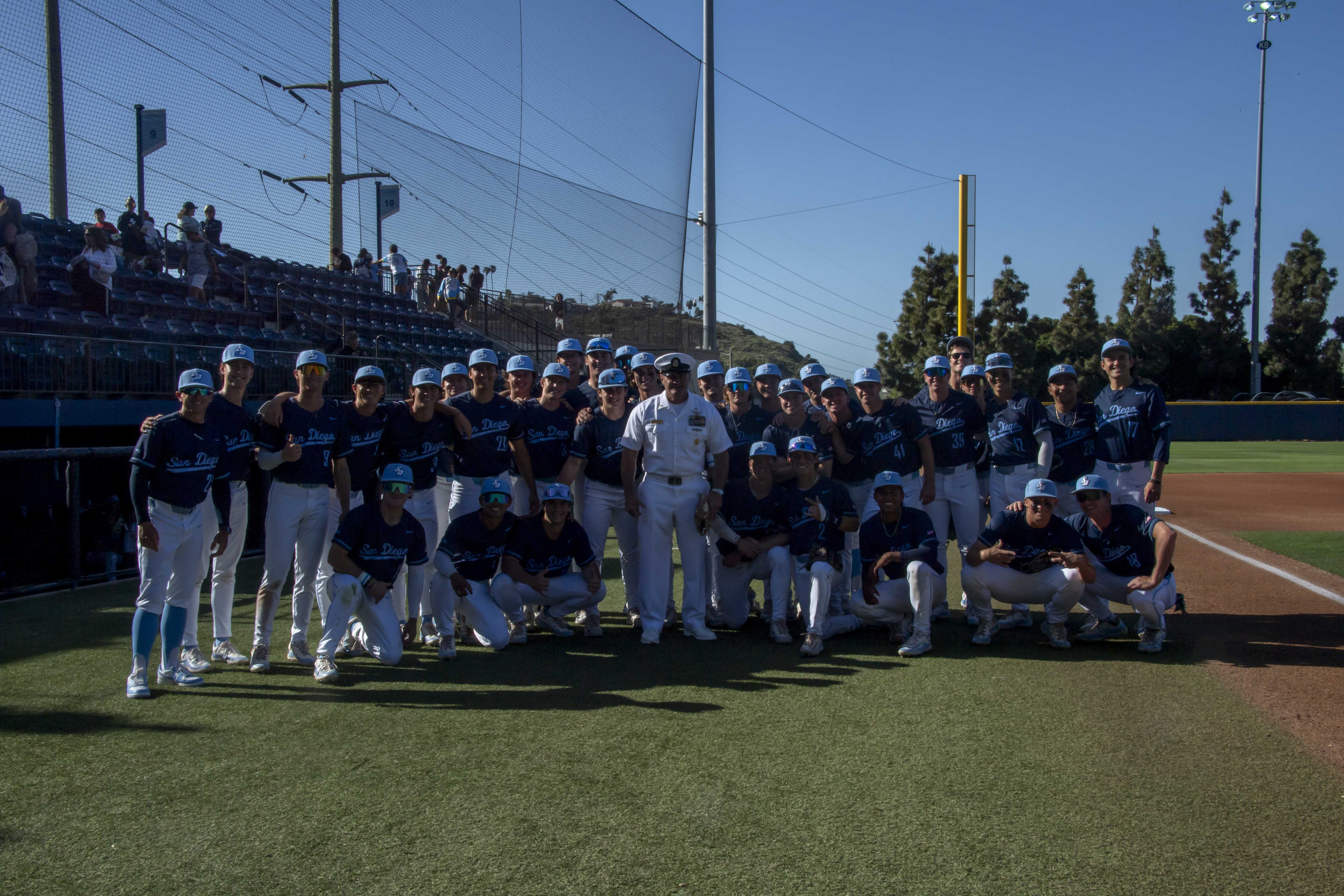
The Toreros baseball team at Fowler Park in 2024

Brock Ungricht joined San Diego as a hitting coach and recruiting coordinator in 2019. Upon long-time head coach Rich Hill's departure at the end of the 2021 season, Ungricht was elevated to the head coach position.

=== Conference affiliations ===
- Independent (College Division) (1958–1965)
- Southern California Athletic Conference (College Division) (1966–1969)
- Independent (College Division/Division II) (1970–1978)
- Southern California Baseball Association (Division I) (1979–1984)
- West Coast Conference (1985–present)
  - Known as the West Coast Athletic Conference from 1985–1988

== San Diego in the NCAA tournament ==
Year	Record	Pct	Notes
2002	1–2	.333	Mesa Regional
2003	1–2	.333	Fullerton Regional
2006	1–2	.333	Fullerton Regional
2007	0–2	.000	Hosted San Diego Regional
2008	3–2	.600	Long Beach Regional
2010	1–2	.333	Tempe Regional
2012	0–2	.000	Los Angeles Regional
2013	2–2	.500	Los Angeles Regional
2022	1–2	.333	Corvallis Regional
2024	1–2	.333	Santa Barbara Regional
TOTALS	11-20	.355	

== Venues ==
=== John Cunningham Stadium ===
John Cunningham Stadium, located on the university's campus, was the program's home venue from prior to the 1970 season until after the 2012 season. Before the field's 1970 construction, the program had played at several different venues in San Diego. The field had a capacity of 1,200 spectators and was named for former San Diego head coach, John Cunningham, who coached the team from 1964–1998.

=== Fowler Park ===
Beginning in the 2013 season, the team will play at Fowler Park, built on the location of Cunningham Stadium, which was demolished in summer 2012. Fowler has a capacity of 1,700 spectators that can be expanded to 3,000. The park is named for Ron and Alexis Fowler, who donated much of the stadium's $13 million construction cost. The playing field itself is named Cunningham Field, dedicated to the same coach for whom the program's former venue was named.

== Head coaches ==
The team's most successful head coach is former coach John Cunningham, who won 843 games from 1964–1998. Also, Cunningham's 35 seasons as head coach make him the longest tenured coach in program history. Rich Hill was the program's head coach from 1999 until 2021.

Year(s)	Coach	Seasons	W-L-T	Pct
1958–1963	Mike Morrow	6	82–64	.562
1964–1998	John Cunningham	35	843–839–18	.501
1999-2021	Rich Hill	23	747–514–4	.592
2022–present	Brock Ungricht	3	65–50–1	.565
TOTALS	4	67	1737–1467–23	.542

=== Current coaching staff ===
- Head coach – Brock Ungricht
- Assistant coach / Recruiting Coordinator – Matt Florer
- Assistant coach – Erich Pfohl
- Assistant coach – Ryan Kirby

== Yearly record ==
The following is a list of the Toreros' yearly records since the program began play in 1958.

Statistics overview
Season	Coach	Overall	Conference	Standing	Postseason
Independent (College Division) (1958–1965)
1958	Mike Morrow	7–12			
1959	Mike Morrow	17–7			
1960	Mike Morrow	19–8			
1961	Mike Morrow	16–10			
1962	Mike Morrow	14–11			
1963	Mike Morrow	9–16			
1964	John Cunningham	12–19			
1965	John Cunningham	17–21			
Independent (College):		111–104			
Southern California Athletic Conference (College Division) (1966–1969)
1966	John Cunningham	20–26	8–6		
1967	John Cunningham	14–26	6–8		
1968	John Cunningham	13–24–1	5–6–1		
1969	John Cunningham	22–17	6–6		
SCAC:		69–93–1	25–26–1		
Independent (College Division/Division II) (1970–1978)
1970	John Cunningham	21–16			
1971	John Cunningham	34–12			
1972	John Cunningham	20–19			
1973	John Cunningham	19–22			
1974	John Cunningham	23–15			
1975	John Cunningham	19–20			
1976	John Cunningham	26–16			
1977	John Cunningham	24–19			
1978	John Cunningham	33–22			
Independent:		219–161			
Southern California Baseball Association (1979–1984)
1979	John Cunningham	32–19–1	13–12–1	4th	
1980	John Cunningham	30–25–1	12–13–1	5th	
1981	John Cunningham	30–25–1	15–12	4th	
1982	John Cunningham	29–24–1	13–15	4th	
1983	John Cunningham	17–27–1	10–18–1	6th	
1984	John Cunningham	20–36–1	6–21–1	8th	
SCBA:		158–156–6	69–91–4		
West Coast Athletic Conference/West Coast Conference (1985–present)
1985	John Cunningham	17–39–1	5–19	7th	
1986	John Cunningham	26–25–2	6–18	7th	
1987	John Cunningham	29–25–1	8–14–1	t-5th	
1988	John Cunningham	28–28	9–14	4th	
1989	John Cunningham	22–31–1	5–17	6th	
1990	John Cunningham	24–32	16–14	5th	
1991	John Cunningham	21–34–2	11–22	5th	
1992	John Cunningham	28–24	14–13	2nd	
1993	John Cunningham	36–17	19–11	2nd	
1994	John Cunningham	29–25–1	14–16	3rd	
1995	John Cunningham	25–27	14–14	3rd	
1996	John Cunningham	27–27–1	21–7	2nd	
1997	John Cunningham	25–27–2	13–15	4th	
1998	John Cunningham	29–30	18–12	t-3rd	
1999	Rich Hill	28–27–1	13–16–1	3rd (West)	
2000	Rich Hill	34–27–1	14–16	2nd (West)	
2001	Rich Hill	35–21	20–10	2nd (West)	
2002	Rich Hill	39–23	20–12	1st (West)	Tempe Regional
2003	Rich Hill	32–30	18–12	1st (West)	Fullerton Regional
2004	Rich Hill	35–21	19–11	2nd (Coast)	
2005	Rich Hill	30–27–1	16–14	2nd (Coast)	
2006	Rich Hill	33–25	13–8	3rd	Fullerton Regional
2007	Rich Hill	43–18	18–3	1st	San Diego Regional (#8 National Seed)
2008	Rich Hill	44–17	16–5	1st	Long Beach Regional
2009	Rich Hill	29–25	11–10	5th	
2010	Rich Hill	37–22	19–2	1st	Tempe Regional
2011	Rich Hill	22–31	11–10	t-3rd	
2012	Rich Hill	40–17	15–9	2nd	Los Angeles Regional
2013	Rich Hill	37–25	15–9	t-2nd	Los Angeles Regional (2nd Place)
WCAC/WCC:		1216-961-14	411–353–2		
Total:		1443–1259-21			
National champion Postseason invitational champion Conference regular season champion Conference regular season and conference tournament champion Division regular season champion Division regular season and conference tournament champion Conference tournament champion

== Toreros in the Major Leagues ==
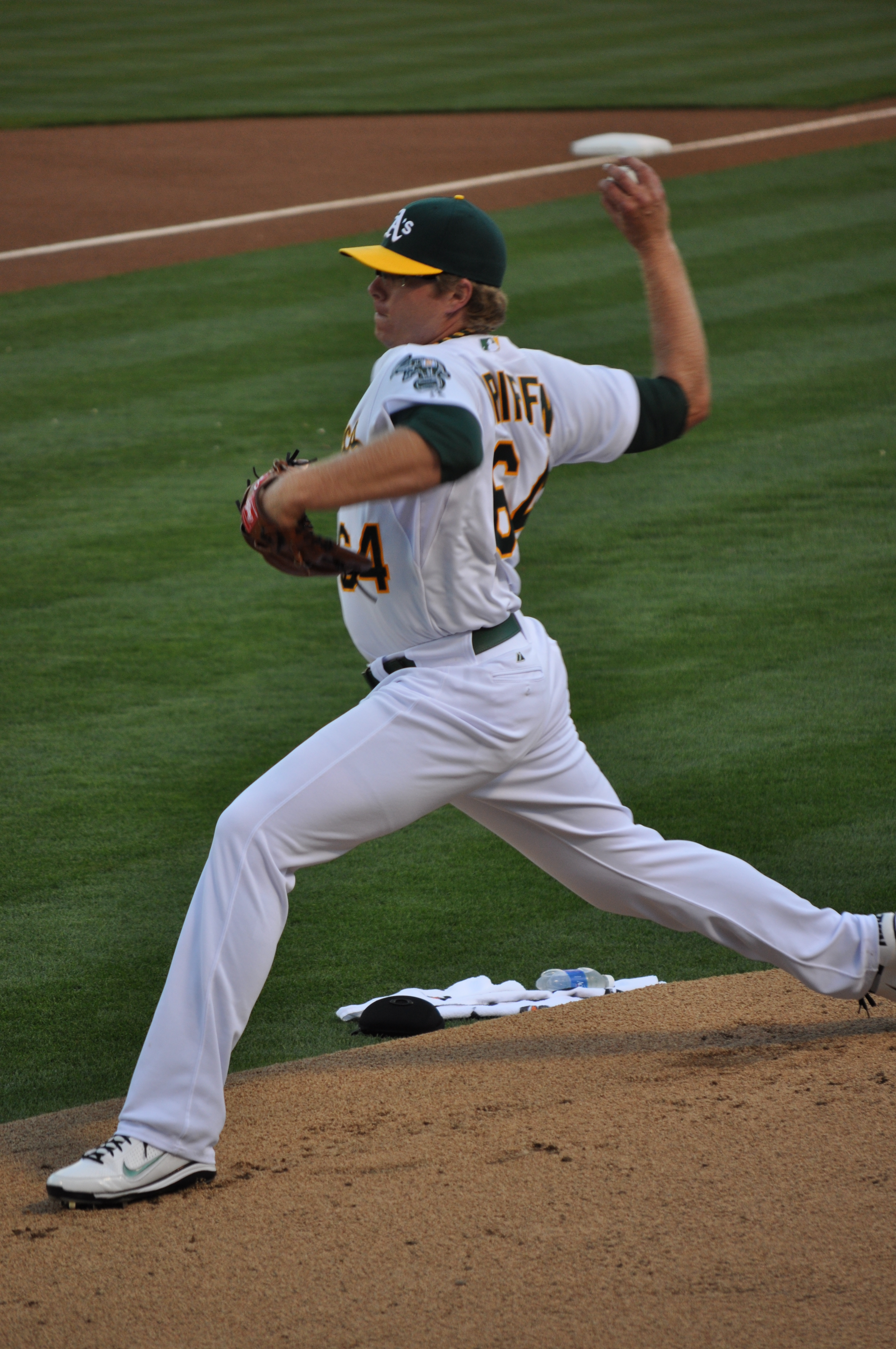
Former Torero A. J. Griffin, who was named a Freshman All-American in 2007 and a Second-Team All-American in 2008, shown pitching for the MLB's Oakland Athletics.

= All-Star	= Baseball Hall of Famer

Athlete	Years in MLB	MLB teams
Kerry Dineen	1975-1976, 1978	New York Yankees, Philadelphia Phillies
John Wathan	1976-1985	Kansas City Royals
Jeff Grotewold	1992, 1995	Philadelphia Phillies, Kansas City Royals
Mike Saipe	1998	Colorado Rockies
Brady Clark	2000-2008	Cincinnati Reds, New York Mets, Milwaukee Brewers, Los Angeles Dodgers, San Diego Padres
Bart Miadich	2001, 2003	Anaheim Angels
Kevin Reese	2005-2006	New York Yankees
Dan Giese	2007-2009	San Francisco Giants, New York Yankees, Oakland Athletics
Freddy Sandoval	2008-2009	Los Angeles Angels of Anaheim
Mike McCoy	2009-2012	Colorado Rockies, Toronto Blue Jays
Josh Butler	2009	Milwaukee Brewers
Brian Matusz	2009-2016	Baltimore Orioles, Chicago Cubs
Anthony Slama	2010-2011	Minnesota Twins
A. J. Griffin	2012-2013, 2016-2017	Oakland Athletics, Texas Rangers
Zach Walters	2013-2016	Washington Nationals, Cleveland Indians, Los Angeles Dodgers
Sammy Solís	2015-2018	Washington Nationals
James Pazos	2015-2020	New York Yankees, Seattle Mariners, Colorado Rockies
Kris Bryant	2015-present	Chicago Cubs, San Francisco Giants, Colorado Rockies
Paul Sewald	2017-present	New York Mets, Seattle Mariners, Arizona Diamondbacks
Dylan Covey	2017-2020, 2023-present	Chicago White Sox, Boston Red Sox, Los Angeles Dodgers, Philadelphia Phillies
Connor Joe	2019, 2021-present	San Francisco Giants, Colorado Rockies, Pittsburgh Pirates
Riley Adams	2021-present	Toronto Blue Jays, Washington Nationals
Chase Meidroth	2025	Chicago White Sox

Taken from the 2020 San Diego Toreros Record Book.

== See also ==
- List of NCAA Division I baseball programs
