= Portland Pilots baseball =

Portland Pilots
- 2026 Portland Pilots baseball team
- University: University of Portland
- Head coach: Geoff Loomis (11th season)
- Conference: West Coast Conference
- Location: Portland, Oregon
- Home stadium: Joe Etzel Field (Capacity: 1,300)
- Nickname: Pilots
- Colors: Purple and white

NCAA tournament appearances
- 1957, 1958, 1979, 1989, 1991

Conference regular season champions
- 1979

The Portland Pilots baseball team represents University of Portland, which is located in Portland, Oregon, United States. The Pilots are an NCAA Division I college baseball program that competes in the West Coast Conference since 1996. Formerly, they participated in the Northern Pacific Conference from 1974 to 1981 and the Northern Division of the Pac-10 Conference from 1982 to 1995.

== NCAA Tournament ==
Portland has participated in the NCAA Division I baseball tournament five times.

Year	Region	Round	Opponent	Result
1957	District 8	Semifinal Game1; Semifinal Game 2 Semifinal Game 3	Pepperdine	W 5–4; L 5–6; L 6–7
1958	District 8	Semifinal Game 1 Semifinal Game 2 Semifinal Game 3 Final Game 1 Final Game 2	Occidental; USC	L 2–5; W 3–0; W 3–0; L 0–6; L 1–11
1979	West Region	First Round; Lower Round	Fresno State; Cal State Fullerton	L 8–10; L 3–20
1989	West II Regional	First Round; Lower Round	Wichita State; Notre Dame	L 0–4; L 6–8
1991	West II Regional	First Round; Second Round; Third Round	Miami; San Diego State; Cal State Northridge	L 1–13; W 12–5; L 7–12
