= Loyola Marymount Lions baseball =

Baseball team representing Loyola Marymount University

- 2026 Loyola Marymount Lions baseball team
- Founded: 1911
- University: Loyola Marymount University
- Athletic director: Craig Pintens
- Head coach: Donegal Fergus (3rd season)
- Conference: West Coast Conference
- Location: Los Angeles, CA
- Home stadium: George C. Page Stadium (capacity: 1,200)
- Nickname: Lions
- Colors: Crimson and blue

College World Series appearances
- 1986

NCAA regional champions
- 1986

NCAA tournament appearances
- 1973, 1986, 1988, 1989, 1990, 1998, 1999, 2000, 2019

Conference tournament champions
- 1999, 2000, 2019

Conference regular season champions
- 1973, 1986, 1990, 1998, 1999, 2000, 2017, 2023

The Loyola Marymount Lions baseball team represents Loyola Marymount University, in Los Angeles, CA in college baseball. The program is classified in the NCAA Division I, and the team competes in the West Coast Conference. The team is coached by Donegal Fergus.

The Lions have been to the College World Series once, in 1986, and also recorded 9 NCAA appearances, and 10 West Coast Conference Championships (three Championship Series and seven regular season). As of 2020, 105 Major League Baseball draft players from LMU have been selected in the draft. More than 34 players from the school have played in MLB including C. J. Wilson, Scott McGregor, Trevor Megill, and David Fletcher.

== Loyola Marymount in the NCAA tournament ==
Year	Record	Pct	Notes
1973	0–2	.000	District 8
1986	5–3	.625	College World Series 5th place, West Division Champions
1988	2–2	.500	Midwest Regional
1989	2–2	.500	West I Regional
1990	0–2	.000	West II Regional
1998	1–2	.333	West Regional
1999	0–2	.000	Stanford Regional
2000	1–2	.333	Fullerton Regional
2019	2–2	.500	Los Angeles Regional
TOTALS	13-19	.406	

== Facilities ==
The Lions play home games at George C. Page Stadium, a 1,200-seat stadium which has been home to the program since 1983.
