= Saint Mary's Gaels baseball =

Saint Mary's Gaels
- 2026 Saint Mary's Gaels baseball team
- Founded: 1968
- Overall record: 1314-1615-17
- University: Saint Mary's College of California
- Head coach: Eric Valenzuela (9th season)
- Conference: West Coast Conference
- Location: Moraga, California
- Home stadium: Louis Guisto Field (capacity: 1,100)
- Nickname: Gaels
- Colors: Navy, red, and silver

NCAA tournament appearances
- 2016, 2025, 2026

Conference tournament champions
- 2016, 2025, 2026

Conference regular season champions
- 2016

The Saint Mary's Gaels baseball team represents Saint Mary's College of California, which is located in Moraga, California. The Gaels are an NCAA Division I college baseball program that competes in the West Coast Conference.

== NCAA tournament ==
Saint Mary's has participated in the NCAA Division I baseball tournament three times. In the 2026 tournament, Saint Mary's became the first team in tournament history to win against the #1 overall seed by defeating UCLA 3–2 in the 2026 Los Angeles Regional Opener.

Year	Round	Opponent	Result
2016	Raleigh Regional	Coastal Carolina; Navy	L 5–2; L 5–8 (13)
2025	Corvallis Regional	Oregon State; Southern California; Oregon State	W 6–4; L 4–6; L 3–20
2026	Los Angeles Regional	UCLA; Cal Poly; UCLA; Cal Poly	W 3–2; L 1–14; W 6–5; L 2–5

== List of coaches ==
Coach	Tenure	Record	Conference Record
Ed Lake	1968	8–23	2–18
Odell Youngblood	1969	9–32	3–17
Floyd Baker	1970–1971	33–49–2	14–25–1
Doug Weise	1972	21–22	7–17
Miles McAffee	1973–1980	215–188–7	104–107–1
Tom Wheeler	1981–1985	141–126–4	80–73
Jim Jones	1986–1989	84–142	33–61
Don Jamerson	1990–1995	133–189	75–110
Rod Ingram	1996–1998	47–100	29–54
John Baptista	1999–2003	100–166–1	56–92
Jedd Soto	2004–2013	209–275–3	73–137
Gabe Zappin (interim)	2013	17–26	11–13
Eric Valenzuela	2014–2019	180–156	85–77
Greg Moore	2020–2023	81–92	34–47
Eric Valenzuela	2024–present	34–22	16–8

== See also ==
- List of NCAA Division I baseball programs
