= San Francisco Dons baseball =

San Francisco Dons
- 2026 San Francisco Dons baseball team
- University: University of San Francisco
- Head coach: Rob DiToma (4th season)
- Conference: West Coast Conference
- Location: San Francisco, California
- Home stadium: Dante Benedetti Diamond at Max Ulrich Field (capacity: 2,000)
- Nickname: Dons
- Colors: Green and gold

NCAA tournament appearances
- 2006, 2011, 2013

Conference regular season champions
- 2006, 2011

The San Francisco Dons baseball team represents the University of San Francisco, which is located in San Francisco, California. The Dons are an NCAA Division I college baseball program that competes in the West Coast Conference.

== NCAA Tournament ==
San Francisco has participated in the NCAA Division I baseball tournament three times.

Year	Round	Opponent	Result
2006	Lincoln Regional	Miami; Nebraska; Manhattan	L 2–11; W 5–1; L 4–6
2011	Los Angeles Regional	UCLA; UC Irvine; UCLA	W 3–0; L 3–4; L 1–4
2013	Eugene Regional	Rice; South Dakota State; Oregon	L 2–3; W 4–3; L 1–6

== History ==
The program began play in 1962. Dante Bendetti served as the first coach in program history, serving until 1980 and winning 373 games, a mark not succeeded until Nino Giarratano (hired in 1999 after being the hitting coach at Arizona State University). The 2005 team won a program record 38 games in 56 games to go along with eight players in the all-conference team and coach of the year honors. The 2006 team went 38–21 record and won a share of the WCC conference regular season championship. They lost the tournament final to Pepperdine but were given an at large berth into their first ever NCAA tournament.

Three Dons have been selected in the first round of the MLB draft. Aaron Poreda was drafted by the Chicago White Sox 2007 Major League Baseball draft after having a conference best ERA of 2.49 in 2006. Kyle Zimmer became the second Don to be a first round MLB draft selection in 2012, and Bradley Zimmer became the third in 2014.

USF began receiving reports of sexual misconduct and psychological abuse from the baseball team in late 2021, attributing these allegations eventually to assistant coach Troy Nakamura and firing him in January 2023. Two months later, it was reported that Nakamura was permitted access to the baseball facilities by Giarrantano, and a class action was filed against both Nakamura and Giarrantano the following March by three anonymous players. Two days after the suit was filed, Giarrantano was fired with assistant coach Mat Keplinger becoming interim head coach. The following season, Rob DiToma, then head coach of the Fairleigh Dickinson Knights baseball team, was hired as new head baseball coach.

== See also ==
- List of NCAA Division I baseball programs
