= West Coast Conference =

College athletics conference

- Formerly: West Coast Athletic Conference (1956–1989); California Basketball Association (1952–1956)
- Association: NCAA
- Founded: 1952; 74 years ago
- Commissioner: Stu Jackson (since 2023)
- Sports fielded: 16; men's: 7; women's: 9
- Division: Division I
- Subdivision: Non-football
- No. of teams: 10 (12 in 2027)
- Headquarters: San Mateo, California
- Region: Western United States
- Broadcasters: ESPN; CBS Sports
- Website: wccsports.com

Locations
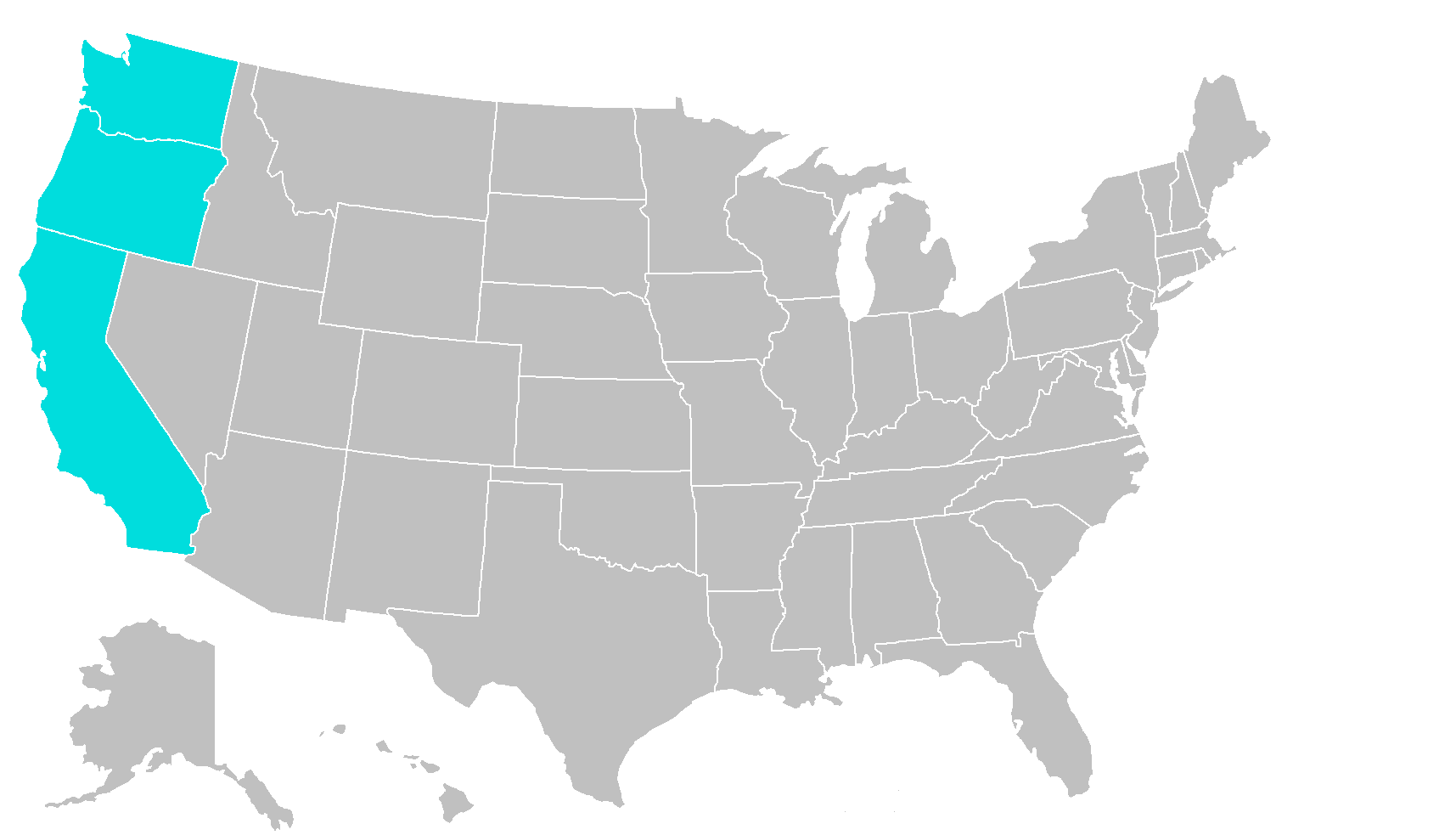

The West Coast Conference (WCC) — known as the California Basketball Association from 1952 to 1956 and then as the West Coast Athletic Conference until 1989 — is a collegiate athletic conference affiliated with NCAA Division I consisting of 10 member schools across the states of California, Colorado, Oregon, and Washington.

All of the full members are private institutions, with all but one being faith-based. Seven members are Catholic Church affiliates, with four of these schools being Jesuit institutions. Pepperdine is an affiliate of the Churches of Christ. The University of the Pacific (which rejoined in 2013 after a 42-year absence) is affiliated with the United Methodist Church, although it has been financially independent of the church since 1969. The only secular institution is the University of Denver, which joined in 2026. Although founded by Methodists, it has been nonsectarian from its founding.

== History ==
WCC full member locations
– Full member
– Future full member

The league was chartered by five northern California institutions, four from the San Francisco Bay Area (San Francisco, Saint Mary's, Santa Clara, San Jose State) and one, Pacific, from Stockton. It began as the California Basketball Association, playing its first game on January 2, 1953. After two seasons under that name, the conference expanded to include Los Angeles-area schools Loyola (now Loyola Marymount) and Pepperdine in 1955 and became the "West Coast Athletic Conference" in 1956. After more than three decades as the WCAC, the name was shortened in the summer of 1989, dropping the word "Athletic".

During the massive upheaval of conference affiliations in the 1990s, the WCC remained very stable. Before the 2010 realignment that eventually led to Brigham Young joining the conference, the last change of membership was in 1980, when Seattle University left the conference. At the time, only the Ivy League and Pacific-10 Conference (now the Pac-12 Conference) had remained unchanged for a longer period.

The WCC participates at the NCAA Division I level and is considered to be a mid-major athletic conference. The conference sponsors 15 sports but does not include football as one of them. San Diego (Pioneer Football League) is the only school fielding a football team. Seattle has never sponsored varsity football, while the remaining members have dropped the sport over the decades, some as early as the 1940s, before the conference existed (Portland), and one as late as 2003 (Saint Mary's).

Historically, the WCC's strongest sports have been soccer (nine national champions, including back-to-back women's soccer titles in 2001 and 2002) and tennis (five individual champions and one team champion). The conference has also made its presence felt nationally in men's basketball. San Francisco won two consecutive national titles in the 1950s with all-time great Bill Russell. Seattle made the NCAA championship game in 1958 behind Elgin Baylor who went on to be a revolutionary player in the NBA. Although the WCAC's stature declined in the 1960s, San Francisco was reckoned as a "major" basketball power until the early 1980s. Also of note was Loyola Marymount's inspired run to the Elite Eight in 1990 following the death of Hank Gathers during that season's WCC championship tournament.

West Coast Conference logo from 2011 to 2019

WCC affiliate member locations
– Affiliate member
Not pictured: Affiliate members Augusta and Creighton

More recently, the rise of now-former member Gonzaga to national prominence after being invited to the NCAA tournament every year since their Cinderella run to the "Elite Eight" in 1999 has helped make the WCC a household name. As San Francisco was from the 1940s to the early 1980s, Gonzaga has gained recognition as a major basketball power, despite the WCC being a mid-major conference. Gonzaga has been to 23 consecutive NCAA tournaments—the longest streak for any school in the Western United States, the third-longest active streak, and the sixth-longest streak in history. They have also been to all but one WCC tournament final since 1995, and have played for the conference title every year since 1998. In 2016–17, the Bulldogs advanced all the way to the national championship game—the deepest run by a conference team since San Francisco went to three consecutive Final Fours from 1955 to 1957. The Bulldogs reached the title game again in 2021, this time entering the game unbeaten, but again losing, this time to Baylor.

Saint Mary's has also made marks for the conference as the Gaels appeared in the NCAA Tournament in 2005, 2008, 2010, 2012, 2013, 2017, 2019, and 2021 (making the "Sweet Sixteen" in 2010).

Eventually, with the 2010 realignment opening up new avenues for expansion, the WCC decided to revisit expansion plans. The conference decided that it would only seek out private schools, but would not limit its search to faith-based institutions. Even so, the two additions, Brigham Young University and University of the Pacific are both faith-based institutions, although Pacific has not been financially sponsored by the United Methodist Church since 1969.

On August 31, 2010, BYU announced plans to join the WCC for the 2011–12 season in all sports the conference offers. BYU joined the conference on July 1, 2011. BYU's arrival gave the WCC another school with a rich basketball tradition. The Cougars made the NCAA Tournament six straight times before failing to do so in 2013, and had made 26 NCAA Tournament appearances before joining the conference.

On March 27, 2012, the University of the Pacific (UOP), a charter member of the conference in 1952, accepted an invitation to rejoin the WCC, effective July 1, 2013. The move removed Pacific from the Big West Conference back to the WCC, which Pacific left in 1971 in order to pursue its interests in football that it later abandoned in 1995.

The WCC became the first Division I conference to adopt a conference-wide diversity hiring commitment, announcing the "Russell Rule", based on the NFL's Rooney Rule and named after Basketball Hall of Famer and social activist Bill Russell, a graduate of charter and current conference member San Francisco, on August 2, 2020. In its announcement, the WCC stated:

The "Russell Rule" requires each member institution to include a member of a traditionally underrepresented community in the pool of final candidates for every athletic director, senior administrator, head coach and full-time assistant coach position in the athletic department.

In September 2021, BYU announced that it would leave the WCC in 2023 for the Big 12 Conference. The WCC announced on July 19, 2022 that it would add men's water polo starting in 2023–24. Full members Loyola Marymount, Pacific, Pepperdine, and Santa Clara were joined by affiliates Air Force, California Baptist, and San Jose State.

=== 2020s conference realignment ===
On December 22, 2023, the WCC announced that Oregon State University and Washington State University, the two schools left behind by the collapse of the Pac-12 Conference, would become affiliate members in all sports apart from football and baseball through 2025–26. This was followed in May 2024 with the announcement that Grand Canyon University and Seattle University would join in July 2025, with Seattle rejoining after a 45-year absence. On October 1, 2024, Gonzaga announced it would be leaving the conference to join the Pac-12 as a full member.

On November 1, 2024, Grand Canyon announced it was declining the WCC's invitation to join the conference in 2025, instead accepting an invitation to join the Mountain West Conference no later than 2026. On September 2, 2025, after coming off their first NCAA March Madness appearance in their first year of eligibility, the WCC extended an offer to the University of California, San Diego to join in 2027. At the time of announcement, UCSD was set to be the WCC's first public school since 1979, when the University of Nevada, Reno (Nevada) left to join the Big Sky Conference.

On October 31, 2025, the University of Denver (DU) announced it would join the West Coast Conference in 2026. DU became the first university in the Rocky Mountain Region to join the conference since BYU left in 2023. It is also the first secular institution to be a full conference member since Nevada's departure; although the school was founded by Methodists, it has been nonsectarian from its founding. The WCC was not done with expansion, announcing on April 10, 2026 that the University of California, Santa Barbara, which had been a member from 1964–1969, would rejoin the conference in 2027 alongside UCSD. This would bring the WCC's full membership to a record of 12.

== Member schools ==
=== Current full members ===
The WCC is currently made up entirely of private institutions. Before the Methodist-founded but nonsectarian Denver joined in 2026, all were Christian institutions, and all but two of those are Catholic. Pacific maintains a historic and active affiliation with the United Methodist Church, remaining the only university in California with this relationship, while Pepperdine is affiliated with the Churches of Christ. This will change in July 2027 with the arrival of the public UC San Diego and UC Santa Barbara.

Institution	Location	Founded	Type	Enrollment	Endowment (millions)	Nickname	Joined (Note: Represents the calendar year when fall sports competition begins.)	Colors
University of Denver	Denver, Colorado	1864	Nonsectarian (Note: Though founded by Methodists, Denver has been a nonsectarian institution since its founding.)	12,894	$1,090.00	Pioneers	2026	
Loyola Marymount University	Los Angeles, California	1865	Catholic (Jesuit)	10,179	$611.3	Lions	1955	
University of the Pacific	Stockton, California	1851	United; Methodist	6,652	$568.2	Tigers	1952	
University of the Pacific	Stockton, California	1851	United; Methodist	6,652	$568.2	Tigers	2013 (Note: Pacific left the WCC after the 1970–71 school year to join the Pacific Coast Athletic Association (now known as the Big West Conference); before rejoining the WCC in 2013–14.)	
Pepperdine University	Malibu, California (Note: The Pepperdine campus has a Malibu mailing address but lies entirely within unincorporated Los Angeles County.)	1937	Churches of Christ	6,000	$1,205	Waves	1955	
University of Portland	Portland, Oregon	1901	Catholic (C.S.C.)	3,200	$297.2	Pilots	1976	
Saint Mary's College of California	Moraga, California	1863	Catholic (F.S.C.)	2,775	$215.0	Gaels	1952	
University of San Diego	San Diego, California	1949	Catholic (Diocese of San Diego)	7,548	$652.5	Toreros	1979	
University of San Francisco	San Francisco, California	1855	Catholic (Jesuit)	10,017	$478.5	Dons	1952	
Santa Clara University	Santa Clara, California	1851	Catholic (Jesuit)	8,300	$1,471.0	Broncos	1952	
Seattle University	Seattle, Washington	1891	Catholic (Jesuit)	7,755	$241.2	Redhawks	1971	
Seattle University	Seattle, Washington	1891	Catholic (Jesuit)	7,755	$241.2	Redhawks	2025 (Note: Seattle left the WCC after the 1979–80 school year to join the National Association of Intercollegiate Athletics (NAIA); before rejoining the WCC in 2025–26.)	

=== Future full members ===
Institution	Location	Founded	Type	Enrollment	Endowment (millions)	Nickname	Joining (Note: Represents the calendar year when fall sports competition begins.)	Colors	Current conference
University of California, San Diego	La Jolla, California (Note: La Jolla is a San Diego neighborhood served by its own post office.)	1960	Public (Note: UC San Diego and UC Santa Barbara will be the first public schools in the conference since the 1978–79 season.)	42,376	$1,589.86	Tritons	2027 (Note: UC San Diego has competed in the WCC as an associate member for women's rowing since the 2026–27 school year.)		Big West (BWC)
University of California, Santa Barbara	Santa Barbara, California (Note: The UCSB campus has a Santa Barbara mailing address, but is outside the city limits in the unincorporated community of Isla Vista.)	1891	Public	26,421	$665.9	Gauchos	2027 (Note: UC Santa Barbara joined the WCC in the 1964–65 school year, but left to become a member of the Big West (then known as the Pacific Coast Athletic Association [PCAA]) after 1968–69.)		Big West (BWC)

=== Associate members ===
Associate member becoming a full WCC member in 2027.
Members departing for the Big West Conference in 2027.

Institution	Location	Founded	Type	Enrollment	Endowment (millions)	Nickname	Joined (Note: Represents the calendar year when fall sports competition begins.)	WCC sport(s)	Primary conference
United States Air Force Academy (Air Force)	USAF Academy, Colorado	1954	Federal	4,304	$98.9	Falcons	2023	Men's water polo	Mountain West (MW)
Augusta University	Augusta, Georgia	1828	Public	9,274	$364.8	Jaguars	2025	Men's golf	Peach Belt (PBC) (Note: Currently an NCAA Division II athletic conference.)
Augusta University	Augusta, Georgia	1828	Public	9,274	$364.8	Jaguars	2025	Women's golf	Peach Belt (PBC)
Creighton University	Omaha, Nebraska	1878	Catholic (Jesuit)	8,910	$713.0	Bluejays	2010	Women's rowing	Big East
San Jose State University	San Jose, California	1857	Public	33,025	$197.1	Spartans	2023	Men's water polo	Mountain West (MW)
University of California, Davis (UC Davis)	Davis, California	1905	Public	40,848	$2,172.7	Aggies	2026	Beach volleyball	Mountain West (MW)
University of California, Davis (UC Davis)	Davis, California	1905	Public	40,848	$2,172.7	Aggies	2026	Men's water polo	Mountain West (MW)
University of California, San Diego (UC San Diego)	La Jolla, California (Note: La Jolla is a San Diego neighborhood served by its own post office.)	1960	Public	42,376	$1,589.86	Tritons	2026	Women's rowing	Big West (BWC)

=== Former full members ===
Of the former members of the WCC, only BYU (Latter Day Saints) and Gonzaga (Catholic, more specifically Jesuit) are Christian institutions. The other five, including returning member UC Santa Barbara, are all public universities.

Institution	Location	Founded	Type	Nickname	Joined (Note: Represents the calendar year when fall sports competition begins.)	Left (Note: Represents the calendar year when spring sports competition ends.)	Current conference
Brigham Young University (BYU)	Provo, Utah	1875	LDS	Cougars	2011	2023	Big 12
California State University, Fresno (Fresno State)	Fresno, California	1911	Public	Bulldogs	1955	1957	Pac-12
Gonzaga University	Spokane, Washington	1887	Catholic (Jesuit)	Bulldogs	1979	2026	Pac-12
University of California, Santa Barbara (UC Santa Barbara, UCSB)	Santa Barbara, California (Note: The UCSB campus has a Santa Barbara mailing address, but is outside the city limits in the unincorporated community of Isla Vista.)	1891	Public	Gauchos	1964	1969	Big West (BWC) (West Coast (WCC) in 2027)
University of Nevada, Reno (Nevada)	Reno, Nevada	1874	Public	Wolf Pack	1969	1979	Mountain West (MW)
University of Nevada, Las Vegas (UNLV)	Las Vegas, Nevada (Note: The UNLV campus lies outside the Las Vegas city limits in the unincorporated community of Paradise. The U.S. Postal Service considers all unincorporated areas within the Las Vegas Valley to have a Las Vegas address.)	1957	Public	Rebels	1969	1975	Mountain West (MW)
San Jose State University (SJSU)	San Jose, California	1857	Public	Spartans	1952	1969	Mountain West (MW)

=== Former associate members ===
Institution	Location	Founded	Type	Nickname	Joined (Note: Represents the calendar year when fall sports competition begins.)	Left (Note: Represents the calendar year when spring sports competition ends.)	WCC sport(s)	Primary conference
California State University, Bakersfield (Cat State Bakersfield, CSUB) (Note: The school started the process of rebranding its athletic program as Bakersfield in 2023–24.)	Bakersfield, California	1965	Public	Roadrunners	2012	2013	Women's golf	Big West (BWC)
California State University, Los Angeles (Cat State Los Angeles, CSULA)	Los Angeles, California	1947	Public	Golden Eagles	1975	1976	Baseball	California (CCAA) (Note: Currently an NCAA Division II athletic conference.)
California Baptist University (Cal Baptist)	Riverside, California	1950	Baptist	Lancers	2023	2026	Men's water polo	Big West (BWC)
University of Nevada, Reno (Nevada)	Reno, Nevada	1874	Public	Wolf Pack	1984	1991	Baseball	Mountain West (MW)
University of Nevada, Reno (Nevada)	Reno, Nevada	1874	Public	Wolf Pack	1985	1987	Women's basketball	Mountain West (MW)
University of Nevada, Reno (Nevada)	Reno, Nevada	1874	Public	Wolf Pack	1985	1987	Women's tennis	Mountain West (MW)
University of Nevada, Reno (Nevada)	Reno, Nevada	1874	Public	Wolf Pack	1985	1987	Women's volleyball	Mountain West (MW)
Oregon State University	Corvallis, Oregon	1868	Public	Beavers	2024	2026	Multiple (Note: Oregon State competed as an associate member in men's and women's basketball, men's and women's soccer, volleyball, softball, men's and women's golf, women's cross country and women's rowing, all of which are sponsored by the post-2026 Pac-12.)	Pac-12
California State University, Sacramento (Sacramento State)	Sacramento, California	1947	Public	Hornets	2024	2026	Women's rowing	Big West (BWC) (Note: Sacramento State currently houses women's rowing in the Mid-American Conference.)
United States International University (USIU)	San Diego, California	1924	Non-profit	Gulls	1985	1987	Women's basketball	N/A (Note: USIU dropped its athletics program following the end of the 1990–91 school year.)
United States International University (USIU)	San Diego, California	1924	Non-profit	Gulls	1985	1987	Women's tennis	N/A
United States International University (USIU)	San Diego, California	1924	Non-profit	Gulls	1985	1987	Women's volleyball	N/A
Washington State University	Pullman, Washington	1890	Public	Cougars	2024	2026	Multiple (Note: Washington State competed as an associate member in men's and women's basketball, women's soccer, volleyball, men's and women's golf, women's tennis, men's and women's cross country and women's rowing, all of which are sponsored by the post-2026 Pac-12.)	Pac-12

=== Membership timeline ===
Full member (all sports) Full member (non-football) Associate member (basketball) Associate member (other sports) Other Conference Other Conference

- Due to space limitations, the following affiliations are not linked within the timeline:
  - Fresno State had dual membership with the California Collegiate Athletic Association (CCAA) during their tenure in the WCAC before committing full-time with the CCAA from 1957 to 1969.
  - Pepperdine was an independent school for the 1954–55 school year.
  - UC Santa Barbara joined what was then the Pacific Coast Athletic Association (PCAA) in 1969. It left in 1974 to become independent and returned in 1976.
  - USIU was a full independent after departing the WCC before dropping all collegiate athletics in at the end of the 1990–91 school year.
  - Oregon State and Washington State have a two-year agreement with the WCC for associate memberships in various sports. It has not been announced which conference the associate sports will join in 2026.

== Sports ==
The West Coast Conference sponsors championship competition in seven men's and nine women's NCAA sanctioned sports, with the newest addition being men's water polo in 2023–24. The conference announced that it would begin sponsoring men's and women's swimming and diving beginning with the 2027–28 academic year. This coincides with the addition of UC San Diego and UC Santa Barbara, which would bring the conference over the threshold required for an automatic bid in at least the men's sport, and further solidify the women's lineup.

Teams in West Coast Conference competition
Sport	Men's	Women's
Baseball	9	–
Basketball	10	10
Beach Volleyball	–	9
Cross country	8	9
Golf	10	6
Rowing	–	7
Soccer	9	10
Softball	–	6
Swimming & Diving (27–28)	6	8
Tennis	8	9
Volleyball	–	10
Water Polo	8	–

=== Men's sports ===
Men's sponsored sports by school
School	Baseball	Basketball	Cross country	Golf	Soccer	Tennis	Water polo	Total sports
Denver	No	Yes	No	Yes	Yes	Yes	No	4
Loyola Marymount	Yes	Yes	No	Yes	Yes	Yes	Yes	6
Pacific	Yes	Yes	Yes	Yes	Yes	Yes	Yes	7
Pepperdine	Yes	Yes	Yes	Yes	No	Yes	Yes	6
Portland	Yes	Yes	Yes	No	Yes	Yes	No	5
Saint Mary's	Yes	Yes	Yes	Yes	Yes	Yes	Yes	7
San Diego	Yes	Yes	Yes	Yes	Yes	Yes	No	6
San Francisco	Yes	Yes	Yes	Yes	Yes	No	No	5
Santa Clara	Yes	Yes	Yes	Yes	Yes	Yes	Yes	7
Seattle	Yes	Yes	Yes	Yes	Yes	No	No	5
Associate members
Air Force							Yes	1
Augusta				Yes				1
San Jose State							Yes	1
UC Davis							Yes	1
Totals	9	10	8	10	9	8	8	62
Future full members
UC San Diego	Yes	Yes	Yes	Yes	Yes	Yes	Yes	7
UC Santa Barbara	Yes	Yes	Yes	Yes	Yes	Yes	Yes	7

Men's varsity sports not sponsored by the West Coast Conference which are played by WCC schools
School	Fencing	Football	Ice hockey	Lacrosse	Rowing (Note: The NCAA sanctions rowing only for women. Men's college rowing is governed by the Intercollegiate Rowing Association.)	Skiing	Swimming & diving	Track & field (indoor)	Track & field (outdoor)	Volleyball
Denver	No	No	NCHC	Big East	No	RMISA	MPSF	No	No	No
Pacific	No	No	No	No	No	No	MPSF	MPSF	Independent	MPSF
Pepperdine	No	No	No	No	No	No	No	No	Independent	MPSF
Portland	No	No	No	No	No	No	No	MPSF	Independent	No
Saint Mary's	No	No	No	No	No	No	MPSF	Independent	Independent	No
San Diego	No	Pioneer League	No	No	MPSF	No	No	No	No	No
UC San Diego	MPSF	No	No	No	MPSF	No	MPSF	No	Big West	Big West
San Francisco	No	No	No	No	No	No	No	Independent	Independent	No
UC Santa Barbara	No	No	No	No	ACRA	No	MPSF	Independent	Big West	Big West
Santa Clara	No	No	No	No	MPSF	No	No	Independent	Independent	No
Seattle	No	No	No	No	No	No	MPSF	No	Independent	No

=== Women's sports ===
Women's sponsored sports by school
School	Basketball	Beach volleyball	Cross country	Golf	Rowing	Soccer	Softball	Tennis	Volleyball	Total WCC sports
Denver	Yes	No	No	Yes	No	Yes	No	Yes	Yes	5
Loyola Marymount	Yes	Yes	Yes	No	No	Yes	Yes	Yes	Yes	7
Pacific	Yes	Yes	Yes	No	No	Yes	Yes	Yes	Yes	7
Pepperdine	Yes	Yes	Yes	Yes	No	Yes	No	Yes	Yes	7
Portland	Yes	Yes	Yes	No	Yes	Yes	No	Yes	Yes	7
Saint Mary's	Yes	Yes	Yes	No	Yes	Yes	Yes	Yes	Yes	8
San Diego	Yes	Yes	Yes	No	Yes	Yes	Yes	Yes	Yes	8
San Francisco	Yes	Yes	Yes	Yes	No	Yes	No	No	Yes	7
Santa Clara	Yes	Yes	Yes	Yes	Yes	Yes	Yes	Yes	Yes	9
Seattle	Yes	No	Yes	Yes	Yes	Yes	Yes	Yes	Yes	8
Associate members
Augusta				Yes						1
Creighton					Yes					1
UC Davis		Yes								1
UC San Diego					Yes					1
Totals	10	9	9	6	7	10	6	9	10	76
Future full members
UC San Diego	Yes	No	Yes	No	Yes	Yes	Yes	Yes	Yes	7
UC Santa Barbara	Yes	No	Yes	No	No	Yes	Yes	Yes	Yes	6

Women's varsity sports not sponsored by the West Coast Conference that are played by WCC schools
School	Fencing	Gymnastics	Lacrosse	Skiing	Swimming & diving	Track & field (indoor)	Track & field (outdoor)	Water polo
Denver	No	Big 12	Big East	RMISA	MPSF	No	No	No
Loyola Marymount	No	No	No	No	No	No	No	Golden Coast
Pacific	No	No	No	No	MPSF	MPSF	Independent	Golden Coast
Pepperdine	No	No	No	No	MPSF	MPSF	Independent	No
Portland	No	No	No	No	No	MPSF	Independent	No
Saint Mary's	No	No	No	No	MPSF	MPSF	Independent	Golden Coast
San Diego	No	No	No	No	MPSF	No	Independent	No
UC San Diego	MPSF	No	No	No	MPSF	No	Big West	Big West
San Francisco	No	No	No	No	No	MPSF	Independent	No
UC Santa Barbara	No	No	No	No	MPSF	Independent	Big West	Big West (Note: Has not announced a future affiliation in this sport.)
Santa Clara	No	No	No	No	No	Independent	Independent	Golden Coast
Seattle	No	No	No	No	MPSF	No	Independent	No

== Facilities ==
Future members in green.

School	Basketball arena	Capacity	Baseball stadium	Capacity	Soccer stadium	Capacity
Denver	Hamilton Gymnasium	2,500	Non-baseball member		CIBER Field	2,000
Loyola Marymount	Gersten Pavilion	4,156	George C. Page Stadium	1,200	Sullivan Field	2,000
Pacific	Alex G. Spanos Center	6,150	Klein Family Field	2,500	Knoles Field	600
Pepperdine	Firestone Fieldhouse	3,104	Eddy D. Field Stadium	1,800	Tari Frahm Rokus Field	1,000
Portland	Chiles Center	4,852	Joe Etzel Field	1,000	Merlo Field	4,892
Saint Mary's	University Credit Union Pavilion	3,500	Louis Guisto Field	1,000	Saint Mary's Stadium	5,500
San Diego	Jenny Craig Pavilion	5,100	Fowler Park	1,700	Torero Stadium	6,000
San Francisco	War Memorial Gymnasium	5,300	Dante Benedetti Diamond	2,000	Negoesco Stadium	3,000
Santa Clara	Leavey Center	4,500	Stephen Schott Stadium	1,500	Buck Shaw Stadium	10,300
Seattle	Climate Pledge Arena (Note: Seattle also uses the on-campus Redhawk Center (capacity 999) for home games.)	18,100	Bannerwood Park	700	Championship Field	650
UC San Diego	LionTree Arena	4,200	Triton Ballpark	1,200	Triton Soccer Stadium	1,750
UC Santa Barbara	The Thunderdome	5,600	Caesar Uyesaka Stadium	1,000	Harder Stadium	17,000

== Athletic department revenue by school ==
Total revenue includes ticket sales, contributions and donations, rights and licensing, student fees, school funds and all other sources including TV income, camp income, concessions, and novelties.

Total expenses includes coach and staff salaries, scholarships, buildings and grounds, maintenance, utilities and rental fees, recruiting, team travel, equipment and uniforms, conference dues, and insurance.

The following table shows institutional reporting to the United States Department of Education Equity in Athletics Database for the 2023–24 academic year.

Institution	2023-24 Total Expenses on Athletics	2023-24 Total Revenue from Athletics
Denver	$51,534,887	$51,534,887
Santa Clara	$41,208,054	$41,208,054
Loyola Marymount	$39,654,261	$39,654,261
San Diego	$32,342,967	$32,342,967
Pepperdine	$31,360,732	$31,360,732
UC San Diego	$30,251,874	$30,251,874
UC Santa Barbara	$28,864,183	$28,864,183
Saint Mary's	$27,756,833	$27,756,833
Pacific	$27,745,372	$27,745,372
San Francisco	$27,348,074	$27,348,074
Seattle	$22,676,616	$22,676,616
Portland	$21,690,973	$21,690,973

== Notable sports figures ==
Some of the famous athletes who played collegiately for WCC schools and coaches and executives that attended WCC schools, include:

- Basketball:
  - Mahershala Ali, two-time Academy Award-winning actor who played basketball at Saint Mary's under his birth name of Mahershalalhashbaz Gilmore
  - David Cooke, former NBA player (St. Mary's)
  - Dan Dickau, former NBA player (2002-2008) (Gonzaga)
  - Brandon Davies, former NBA player who currently plays in the Liga ACB. During his sophomore year, he helped BYU rise as high as #3 in the national polls before being suspended for an honor code violation. He was reinstated for his junior and senior seasons and named to the All West Coast Conference team. (2009-2013) (BYU)
  - Rick Adelman, former NBA head coach (Loyola Marymount)
  - Dennis Awtrey, former NBA player (1970-1982) (Santa Clara)
  - Elgin Baylor, Basketball Hall of Fame Player (11-Time All-Star, 10-Time first team All-NBA, 1959 NBA Rookie of the Year, 1st overall pick in the 1958 NBA draft) and coach (1956–58) (Seattle)
  - Bernie Bickerstaff, former NBA head coach (San Diego)
  - Mike Brown, NBA head coach (San Diego)
  - Ricardo Brown, former NBA player, one of the Philippine Basketball Association's 25 Greatest Players
  - Bill Cartwright, former NBA player and head coach, former NBA All-Star (San Francisco)
  - Mike Champion, former NBA player (1988-1989) (Gonzaga)
  - Doug Christie, former NBA player (1993–2007) selected 17th overall in the 1992 NBA Draft by the Seattle SuperSonics (Pepperdine)
  - Darwin Cook, former NBA player (1980-1989) (Portland)
  - Matthew Dellavedova, former NBA player with several teams, and currently with Melbourne United in the Australian NBL (Saint Mary's)
  - Maggie Dixon, former women's head coach at Army (San Diego)
  - Richie Frahm, former NBA player (2003-2008) (Gonzaga)
  - Hank Gathers, college player who led the nation in scoring and rebounding in 1990 before collapsing and dying during the WCC tournament (Loyola Marymount)
  - Rui Hachimura, current NBA player with the Los Angeles Lakers (Gonzaga)˜
  - Bruce Hale, former NBA player (1948–51) (Santa Clara)
  - Elias Harris, current Germany international (Gonzaga)
  - Chet Holmgren, current NBA player with the Oklahoma City Thunder (Gonzaga)˜
  - Dennis Johnson, Basketball Hall of Famer, former NBA player (1976-1990) 1979 NBA Finals MVP and 5-Time NBA All-Star. Coached the Los Angeles Clippers for one season (2003) (Pepperdine)
  - K. C. Jones, former NBA player (1958-1967), and Basketball Hall of Famer (San Francisco)
  - Bo Kimble, former NBA player (1990-1993) (Loyola Marymount)
  - Corey Kispert, current NBA player with the Washington Wizards (Gonzaga)˜
  - Harold Keeling, former NBA player, (1986), (Santa Clara)
  - Tom Meschery, former NBA player (1961-1971), and NBA All-Star (1963) (Saint Mary's)
  - Patty Mills, current Australia men's international with the Los Angeles Clippers (Saint Mary's)
  - Adam Morrison, former NBA player known for being the 3rd overall pick in the 2006 NBA draft by the Charlotte Bobcats and the 2005-06 National College Co-Player of the Year (Gonzaga)
  - Austin Daye, former NBA player, also with European professional experience. Selected with the 15th pick of the 2009 NBA Draft (Gonzaga)
  - Stew Morrill, former college head coach Utah State (Gonzaga)
  - Eric Musselman, former NBA head coach (San Diego)
  - Steve Nash, Basketball Hall of Famer, former NBA player (1996-2014) and 2005 and 2006 NBA MVP (Santa Clara)
  - Andrew Nembhard, current NBA player with the Indiana Pacers (Gonzaga)˜
  - Dick O'Keefe, inaugural season NBA player, (1947–51) (Santa Clara)
  - Bud Ogden, former NBA player, (1969-1971) (Santa Clara)
  - Michael Olowokandi, former NBA player (Pacific)
  - Kelly Olynyk, current Canada men's international with the Miami Heat (Gonzaga)
  - Jeremy Pargo, current NBA player with the Cleveland Cavaliers (Gonzaga)
  - Filip Petrušev, NBA draft 2021, Philadelphia 76ers; currently plays for Crvena zvezda of the Adriatic League and EuroLeague (Gonzaga)
  - Kurt Rambis, former NBA player (1981-1995) and NBA head coach (1999 and 2009-2011) (Santa Clara)
  - Bill Russell, Basketball Hall of Fame Player (12-Time All-Star, 5-Time NBA MVP, and 11-Time NBA Champion) and coach, 1956 College Player of the Year (San Francisco)
  - Robert Sacre, current NBA player with the Los Angeles Lakers, and current Canada international (Gonzaga)
  - Omar Samhan, currently playing in Lithuania and the Euroleague with Žalgiris (Saint Mary's)
  - Ken Sears, former NBA Player (1955–64), First basketball player on a Sports Illustrated cover. (Santa Clara)
  - Jose Slaughter, former NBA player (1982-1983) (Portland)
  - Erik Spoelstra, current head coach of the Miami Heat (Portland)
  - John Stockton, Basketball Hall of Famer (10-Time All-Star, and All-Time NBA Leader in Assists and Steals) (Gonzaga)
  - Jalen Suggs, current NBA player with the Orlando Magic (Gonzaga)
  - Drew Timme, current player with the Long Island Nets in the NBA G League (Gonzaga)˜
  - Ronny Turiaf, former NBA player (Gonzaga)
  - Courtney Vandersloot, current WNBA player with the New York Liberty (Gonzaga)
  - Nick Vanos, former NBA player, (1985–87) (Santa Clara)
- Soccer:
  - Conor Casey, 2010 MLS Cup MVP, 2009 MLS Best XI, and former United States men's national soccer team forward (Portland)
  - Brandi Chastain, member of the USA national team that won the 1999 Women's World Cup (Santa Clara)
  - Steve Cherundolo, Hannover 96 captain and three-time World Cup veteran (2002, 2006, 2010) with the United States men's national soccer team (Portland)
  - Brian Ching, USA men's national team player (Gonzaga)
  - John Doyle, general manager of the San Jose Earthquakes, former USA men's national team player (San Francisco)
  - Kasey Keller, former US international goalkeeper and four-time World Cup (1994, 1998, 2002, 2006) veteran (Portland)
  - Shannon MacMillan, member of the 1999 Women's World Cup winners (Portland)
  - Tiffeny Milbrett, member of the 1999 Women's World Cup winners (Portland)
  - Megan Rapinoe, former American professional soccer player who played the United States women's national soccer team (Portland)
  - Christine Sinclair, two-time Hermann Trophy winner and all-time leading goal scorer for the Canadian women's national team (Portland)
  - Aly Wagner, 2002 Hermann Trophy winner and member of the US women's soccer team that won gold at the 2004 Olympics (Santa Clara)
- Baseball:
  - Jon Moscot, major league baseball pitcher (Cincinnati Reds)
  - Jason Bay, 2004 National League Rookie of the Year and three-time All-Star (Gonzaga)
  - Vance Law, former MLB player, and 1-time MLB All-Star (1988). Former BYU Baseball Coach (2000-2012). Son of MLB Pitcher Vern Law. (BYU)
  - Randy Winn, former MLB outfielder and 2002 All-Star (Santa Clara)
  - Dan Haren, former MLB player, 2007 American League All-Star Game starting pitcher, (Pepperdine)
  - Noah Lowry, former MLB pitcher (Pepperdine)
  - Mike Redmond, former MLB catcher and former manager of the Florida Marlins (Gonzaga)
  - Mark Teahen, former MLB player (Saint Mary's)
  - Tom Candiotti, former MLB pitcher (Saint Mary's)
  - Mike Scott, former major-league pitcher (Pepperdine)
  - Randy Wolf, former MLB pitcher (Pepperdine)
  - Brian Matusz, pitcher with the Baltimore Orioles (San Diego)
  - CJ Wilson, pitcher with the Los Angeles Angels of Anaheim (Loyola Marymount)
  - Theo Epstein, former president of the Chicago Cubs and former general manager of the Boston Red Sox (San Diego – School of Law only; earned bachelor's degree at Yale)
  - Kris Bryant, Chicago Cubs 3rd baseman, 2013 2nd overall draft pick, 2015 National League Rookie of the Year, and 2016 NL MVP leading the Cubs to the 2016 World Series Championship (San Diego)
  - Bill Bavasi, MLB executive (San Diego)
  - Ken Dayley, former major league pitcher, 1980 1st round draft pick, 3rd overall, pitched in both the '85 and '87 World Series for the St. Louis Cardinals (Portland)
  - Bill Krueger, former major league pitcher (Portland)
  - Pat Casey, former Oregon State baseball head coach, his team winning the 2006, 2007, and 2018 College World Series (Portland)
  - Von Hayes, former major league outfielder/first baseman (Saint Mary's)
- Water polo:
  - Terry Schroeder – former NCAA player, two-time Olympic silver medal winner (1984 and 1988), and Head Coach of silver medal winning men's water polo team at the 2008 Summer Olympics (Pepperdine)
  - Merrill Moses – silver medal winner at the 2008 Summer Olympics (Pepperdine)
  - Jesse Smith – silver medal winner at the 2008 Summer Olympics (Pepperdine)
- Volleyball:
  - Mike Whitmarsh – winner of 28 AVP beach volleyball events, as well as a silver medal in the sport at the 1996 Summer Olympics (San Diego – volleyball and basketball; however, men's volleyball is not a WCC sport)
  - Taylor Sander – member of the American US Indoor Volleyball team and a player for Blu Volleyball Verona. Led US national team to an upset of Brazil to win the FIVB World League 2014. Was named best outside spiker and tournament MVP. He holds the BYU all-time single-match record for service aces (nine) and career service aces (182). In the rally-scoring era ranks No. 1 at BYU in career kills (1,743), career attempts (3,464), career service aces (182), season attempts (1,021 in 2014), season service aces (55 in 2014) and aces in a match (nine). (BYU – volleyball; however Men's Indoor volleyball isn't a WCC sport)
- Football
  - Hust Stockton – back; Frankford Yellow Jackets (NFL) (1925–1928). Member of the Yellow Jackets' 1926 NFL Championship team. Grandfather of John Stockton. (Gonzaga)
  - Ray Flaherty – end; Los Angeles Wildcats (1926), New York Yankees (1927–1928), New York Giants (1928–1929, 1931–1935), No. 1 retired. Head Coach; Gonzaga Bulldogs (1930), Boston/Washington Redskins (1936–1942), New York Yankees (1946–1948), Chicago Hornets (1949). Three time NFL champion (1934, 1937, 1942). Pro Football Hall of Fame (1976). (Gonzaga)
  - Tony Canadeo – halfback; Green Bay Packers (1941–1944, 1946–1952). Green Bay Packers Hall of Fame, No. 3 retired, Pro Football Hall of Fame (1974). (Gonzaga)
  - Tom Fears – wide receiver and defensive back; Los Angeles Rams (1948–1956). The first Mexican-born player to be drafted into the National Football League. Broke the NFL's single-season record in 1949 with 77 receptions for 1013 yards, and again in 1950 with 84 receptions for 1116 yards. Career totals include 400 receptions for 5,397 yards and 38 touchdowns. Pro Football Hall of Fame (1970). (Santa Clara)
  - Pete Carroll – current coach of the Las Vegas Raiders, former coach of the Seattle Seahawks of the NFL, former head coach of USC Trojans of the NCAA. Led Seattle to Super Bowl XLVIII, where they defeated the Denver Broncos. Led the USC Trojans to 6 BCS Bowl victories. (Pacific)
  - Ted Leland – a first team PCAA selection as a defensive end in 1969. Current athletic director at Pacific. Served as athletic director at Stanford University for 12 years, leading them to the NACDA Directors' Cup from 1995 to 2005. (Pacific)
  - John Fassel – special teams coordinator for the Tennessee Titans of the NFL. (Pacific)
  - Hue Jackson – former head coach of the Cleveland Browns, former offensive coordinator for the Cincinnati Bengals, former head coach of the Oakland Raiders. (Pacific)

== See also ==
- West Coast Conference men's basketball tournament
- West Coast Conference women's basketball tournament
- West Coast Conference baseball tournament
