= 2016 BYU Cougars baseball team =

American college baseball season

2016 BYU Cougars baseball

2016 WCC Regular Season Co-Champions
- Conference: West Coast Conference
- Record: 37–17 (18–9 WCC)
- Head coach: Mike Littlewood (4th season)
- Assistant coaches: Trent Pratt (4th season); Brent Haring (4th season); Jeremy Thomas (4th season)
- Home stadium: Larry H. Miller Field

2016 West Coast Conference baseball standings
	Conf.				Overall
Team	W		L	PCT	W		L	PCT
BYU ‍†‍‍	18	–	9	.667	37	–	17	.685
Gonzaga ‍†‍‍^{y}	18	–	9	.667	36	–	21	.632
Saint Mary's ‍†‍‡‍^{y}	18	–	9	.667	33	–	25	.569
Pepperdine ‍‍‍	16	–	11	.593	29	–	24	.547
San Francisco ‍‍‍	14	–	13	.519	22	–	34	.393
Loyola Marymount ‍‍‍	13	–	14	.481	26	–	27	.491
San Diego ‍‍‍	13	–	14	.481	27	–	29	.482
Pacific ‍‍‍	12	–	15	.444	22	–	30	.423
Santa Clara ‍‍‍	10	–	17	.370	23	–	29	.442
Portland ‍‍‍	3	–	24	.111	17	–	37	.315
† – Conference champion ‡ – Tournament champion y – Invited to the NCAA tournament As of June 11, 2016; Rankings from Collegiate Baseball

The 2016 BYU Cougars baseball team represented Brigham Young University in the 2016 NCAA Division I baseball season. Mike Littlewood acted in his fourth season as head coach of the Cougars. BYU was picked to finish fifth in the WCC Pre-season rankings. The Cougars would claim a co-regular season title before falling in the WCC Tournament.

== 2016 Roster ==
2016 BYU Cougars Roster
Pitchers: 8 Keaton Cenatiempo – Junior; 9 Mason Marshall – Junior; 11 Easton Walker – Freshman; 18 Connor Williams – Sophomore; 21 Clay Sisler – Freshman; 22 Zach Brinkerhoff – Freshman; 23 Hayden Rogers – Junior; 26 Riley Gates – Sophomore; 27 Michael Rucker – Junior; 32 Maverik Buffo – Sophomore; 34 Jordan Wood – Freshman; 37 Triston Busse – Freshman; 40 Bo Burrup – Freshman; 41 Kendall Motes – Junior; xx Rhett Parkinson – Junior	Infielders: 3 Brennon Anderson – Sophomore; 5 Hayden Nielsen – Senior; 6 Noah Hill – Freshman; 10 Daniel Schneemann – Freshman; 11 Easton Walker – Freshman; 12 Tanner Chauncey – Junior; 16 Casey Jacobsen – Freshman; 24 Bryan Call – Freshman; 25 Nate Favero – Sophomore; 31 Jackson Cluff – Freshman; 35 Colton Shaver – Sophomore	Catchers: 6 Noah Hill – Freshman; 14 Bronson Larsen – Junior; 35 Colton Shaver – Sophomore; 39 Grant Hodges – Sophomore; Outfielders: 2 Brennon Lund – Sophomore; 4 Eric Urry – Junior; 7 Kyle Dean – Freshman; 13 Danny Gelalich – Freshman; 17 Keaton Kringlen – Freshman; 18 Connor Williams – Sophomore; 19 Court Iorg – Sophomore; 21 Clay Sisler – Freshman; 44 Brock Hale – Freshman

== Schedule ==
2016 BYU Cougars Game Log
Regular season
February

Date	Opponent	Rank	Site/stadium	Television	Score	Win	Loss	Save	Attendance	Overall record	WCC record
February 19	vs. St. Louis	–	Cashman Field	None	21–7	Michael Rucker (1–0)	Matt Eckelman (0–1)	None	300	1–0	–
February 20	vs. St. Louis	–	Cashman Field	None	5–0	Maverik Buffo (1–0)	Josh Moore (0–1)	None	500	2–0	–
February 20	vs. St. Louis	–	Cashman Field	None	11–3	Hayden Rogers (1–0)	Connor Lehmann (0–1)	None	500	3–0	–
February 22	vs. St. Louis	–	Cashman Field	None	11–7	Bo Burrup (1–0)	Miller Hogan (0–1)	None	150	4–0	–
February 25	at Samford	–	Joe Lee Griffin Stadium	None	7–1	Michael Rucker (2–0)	Jared Brasher (1–1)	None	176	5–0	–
February 26	at Samford	–	Joe Lee Griffin Stadium	None	4–3 (10)	Mason Marshall (1–0)	Parker Curry (0–1)	None	546	6–0	–
February 26	at Samford	–	Joe Lee Griffin Stadium	None	5–10	Jake Greer (1–0)	Bo Burrup (1–1)	None	546	6–1	–
February 27	at Samford	–	Joe Lee Griffin Stadium	None	6–4	Riley Gates (1–0)	Connor Radcliff (1–1)	Mason Marshall (1)	535	7–1	–

March

Date	Opponent	Rank	Site/stadium	Television	Score	Win	Loss	Save	Attendance	Overall record	WCC record
March 3	at Kansas	–	Hoglund Ballpark	ESPN3	11–10	Bo Burrup (2–1)	Zack Leban (1–1)	Keaton Cenatiempo (1)	821	8–1	–
March 4	at Kansas	–	Hoglund Ballpark	ESPN3	8–2	Maverik Buffo (2–0)	Ben Krauth (0–1)	Jordan Wood (1)	990	9–1	–
March 5	at Kansas	–	Hoglund Ballpark	ESPN3	7–6	Keaton Cenatiempo (1–0)	Stephen Villines (2–1)	Mason Marshall (2)	976	10–1	–
March 8	Utah Valley	–	Larry H. Miller Field	TheW.tv	6–1	Maverik Buffo (3–0)	Danny Beddes (2–2)	None	2,002	11–1	–
March 10	Niagara	–	Larry H. Miller Field	TheW.tv	14–1	Michael Rucker (3–0)	Cody Eckerson (0–2)	None	1,297	12–1	–
March 11	Niagara	–	Larry H. Miller Field	TheW.tv	14–10	Zach Brinkerhoff (1–0)	Liam Stroud (0–1)	Bo Burrup (1)	1,758	13–1	–
March 11	Niagara	–	Larry H. Miller Field	TheW.tv	14–2	Hayden Rogers (2–0)	Zachary Kolodziejski (0–1)	None	1,758	14–1	–
March 12	Niagara	–	Larry H. Miller Field	TheW.tv	15–3	Connor Williams (1–0)	Robert Wilson (0–1)	None	1,266	15–1	–
March 15	Utah	–	Larry H. Miller Field	BYUtv	6–0	Riley Gates (2–0)	Josh Lapiana (0–3)	None	1,880	16–1	–
March 17	Pacific*	–	Larry H. Miller Field	BYUtv	19–3	Michael Rucker (4–0)	Will Lydon (0–4)	Easton Walker (1)	833	17–1	1–0
March 18	Pacific*	–	Larry H. Miller Field	None	11–4	Maverik Buffo (4–0)	Ricky Reynoso (1–2)	None	936	18–1	2–0
March 19	Pacific*	–	Larry H. Miller Field	BYUtv	8–10	Fineas Delbonta Smith (2–1)	Mason Marshall (1–1)	Bryce Lombardi (1)	2,132	18–2	2–1
March 24	Loyola Marymount*	#23	Larry H. Miller Field	BYUtv	4–1	Michael Rucker (5–0)	J.D. Busfield (1–2)	None	1,355	19–2	3–1
March 25	Loyola Marymount*	#23	Larry H. Miller Field	BYUtv	5–10	Cory Abbott (3–2)	Maverik Buffo (4–1)	None	1,005	19–3	3–2
March 26	Loyola Marymount*	#23	Larry H. Miller Field	None	7–4	Easton Walker (1–0)	Tyler Cohen (2–3)	None	1,350	20–3	4–2
March 31	at Portland*	#24	Joe Etzel Field	TheW.tv	8–3	Michael Rucker (6–0)	Jordan Wilcox (4–1)	None	313	21–3	5–2

April

Date	Opponent	Rank	Site/stadium	Television	Score	Win	Loss	Save	Attendance	Overall record	WCC record
April 1	at Portland*	#24	Joe Etzel Field	TheW.tv	4–1	Maverik Buffo (5–1)	Davis Tominaga (2–5)	Mason Marshall (3)	382	22–3	6–2
April 2	at Portland*	#24	Joe Etzel Field	TheW.tv	5–3	Hayden Rogers (3–0)	Jordan Horak (1–2)	None	311	23–3	7–2
April 4	Arizona	#22	Larry H. Miller Field	BYUtv	5–11	Bobby Dalbec (6–3)	Jordan Wood (0–1)	None	2,825	23–4	–
April 7	San Diego*	#22	Larry H. Miller Field	BYUtv	12–2	Michael Rucker (7–0)	Troy Conyers (4–4)	None	2,681	24–4	8–2
April 8	San Diego*	#22	Larry H. Miller Field	TheW.tv	13–1	Maverik Buffo (6–1)	Gary Cornish (4–2)	None	2,552	25–4	9–2
April 9	San Diego*	#22	Larry H. Miller Field	BYUtv	7–13	Nathan Kutcha (2–0)	Connor Williams (1–1)	None	1,807	25–5	9–3
April 12	Utah	#26	Larry H. Miller Field	BYUtv	14–3	Hayden Rogers (4–0)	Tanner Thomas (0–1)	None	2,937	26–5	–
April 14	at Saint Mary's*	#26	Louis Guisto Field	TheW.tv	4–5	Drew Strotman (3–3)	Keaton Cenatiempo (1–1)	None	156	26–6	9–4
April 15	at Saint Mary's*	#26	Louis Guisto Field	TheW.tv	4–7	Johnny York (4–3)	Maverik Buffo (6–2)	Cameron Neff (1)	162	26–7	9–5
April 16	at Saint Mary's*	#26	Louis Guisto Field	TheW.tv	5–4	Bo Burrup (3–2)	Anthony Gonsolin (2–1)	Keaton Cenatiempo (2)	179	27–7	10–5
April 22	#25 Creighton	#30	Larry H. Miller Field	BYUtv	13–4	Michael Rucker (8–0)	Rollie Lacy (6–2)	None	2,445	28–7	–
April 23	#25 Creighton	#30	Larry H. Miller Field	TheW.tv	2–10	Jeff Albrecht (5–0)	Hayden Rogers (4–1)	None	2,116	28–8	–
April 23	#25 Creighton	#30	Larry H. Miller Field	TheW.tv	5–8	Keith Rogalla (4–2)	Jordan Wood 0–1)	None	2,116	28–9	–
April 26	at Utah Valley	–	Brent Brown Ballpark	KSL.com	Ppd. until May 10 due to weather						
April 28	Gonzaga*	–	Larry H. Miller Field	BYUtv	11–2	Michael Rucker (9–0)	Brandon Bailey (6–3)	None	748	29–9	11–5
April 29	Gonzaga*	–	Larry H. Miller Field	BYUtv	5–9	Eli Morgan (8–1)	Hayden Rogers (4–2)	Wyatt Mills (5)	1,323	29–10	11–6
April 30	Gonzaga*	–	Larry H. Miller Field	BYUtv	5–4	Jordan Wood (1–1)	Wyatt Mills (2–2)	None	1,487	30–10	12–6

May

Date	Opponent	Rank	Site/stadium	Television	Score	Win	Loss	Save	Attendance	Overall record	WCC record
May 3	Utah Valley	–	Larry H. Miller Field	BYUtv	6–7 (10)	Jake Mayer (6–1)	Mason Marshall (1–2)	None	1,719	30–11	–
May 5	at Pepperdine*	–	Eddy D. Field Stadium	TheW.tv	9–5	Michael Rucker (10–0)	A. J. Puckett (7–3)	Keaton Cenatiempo (3)	411	31–11	13–6
May 6	at Pepperdine*	–	Eddy D. Field Stadium	TheW.tv	0–3	Chandler Blanchard (3–1)	Hayden Rogers (4–3)	Ryan Wilson (5)	501	31–12	13–7
May 7	at Pepperdine*	–	Eddy D. Field Stadium	TheW.tv	3–4	Max Gamboa (2–6)	Riley Gates (2–1)	Max Green (1)	673	31–13	13–8
May 10	at Utah Valley	–	Brent Brown Ballpark	KSL.com	17–6	Hayden Rodgers (5–3)	Kaden Schmitt (0–2)	None	4,120	32–13	–
May 12	at San Francisco*	–	Dante Benedetti Diamond at Max Ulrich Field	TheW.tv	5–6	Mack Meyer (3–2)	Mason Marshall (1–3)	None	282	32–14	13–9
May 13	at San Francisco*	–	Dante Benedetti Diamond at Max Ulrich Field	TheW.tv	12–6	Mason Marshall (2–3)	Thomas Ponticelli (3–6)	None	314	33–14	14–9
May 14	at San Francisco*	–	Dante Benedetti Diamond at Max Ulrich Field	TheW.tv	9–3	Keaton Cenatiempo (2–1)	James Kannenburg (6–5)	None	551	34–14	15–9
May 17	at Utah	–	Smith's Ballpark	P12	1–8	Nolan Stouder (1–1)	Easton Walker (1–1)	None	5,440	34–15	–
May 19	Santa Clara*	–	Larry H. Miller Field	BYUtv	8–2	Michael Rucker (11–0)	Steven Wilson (5–5)	None	1,487	35–15	16–9
May 20	Santa Clara*	–	Larry H. Miller Field	BYUtv	9–8	Mason Marshall (3–3)	Max Kuhns (1–4)	None	1,647	36–15	17–9
May 21	Santa Clara*	–	Larry H. Miller Field	ESPNU	10–5	Keaton Cenatiempo (3–1)	Jason Seever (6–3)	None	2,541	37–15	18–9
May 26	Gonzaga*	–	Banner Island Ballpark	TheW.tv	3–5	Brandon Bailey (9–3)	Michael Rucker (11–1)	None	1,187	37–16	–
May 27	Pepperdine*	–	Banner Island Ballpark	TheW.tv	2–7	Ryan Wilson (2–0)	Keaton Cenatiempo (3–2)	None	1,127	37–17	–

Rankings from Collegiate Baseball. Parenthesis indicate tournament seedings.
*West Coast Conference games

== Radio Information ==
All but one BYU Baseball series had a radio/internet broadcast available. 36 games were broadcast on KOVO with Brent Norton (play-by-play) calling the games for his 24th consecutive season. A rotating selection of analysts were used. 29 of the games were simulcast on BYU Radio. BYU Radio also had 4 radio exclusives this season: Mar. 8 vs. Utah Valley, Mar. 10 & 11 early vs. Niagara, and May 3 vs. Utah Valley. Robbie Bullough provided play by play for BYU Radio's exclusive games outside of May 3, which was a BYUtv simulcast.

Samford and Kansas both provided an internet broadcast through their respective athletic websites.

== TV Announcers ==
- March 3: Steven Davis & Kevin Wheeler
- March 4: Steven Davis & Kevin Wheeler
- March 5: Steven Davis & Kevin Wheeler
- March 8: Robbie Bullough & Marc Oslund
- March 10: Robbie Bullough & Marc Oslund
- March 11 (early): Robbie Bullough & Marc Oslund
- March 11 (late): Brent Norton & Jeff Bills
- March 12: Brent Norton & Cameron Coughlan
- March 15: Spencer Linton, Gary Sheide, & Jason Shepherd
- March 17: Spencer Linton, Gary Sheide, & Jason Shepherd
- March 19: Spencer Linton, Gary Sheide, & Jason Shepherd
- March 24: Spencer Linton, Gary Sheide, & Jason Shepherd
- March 25: Spencer Linton, Gary Sheide, & Jason Shepherd
- March 31: No commentators
- April 1: Travis Demers & Keith Ramsey
- April 2: No commentators
- April 4: Spencer Linton, Gary Sheide, & Jason Shepherd
- April 7: Spencer Linton, Gary Sheide, & Jason Shepherd
- April 8: Brent Norton & Jeff Bills
- April 9: Spencer Linton, Gary Sheide, & Jason Shepherd
- April 12: Dave McCann, Gary Sheide, & Jason Shepherd
- April 14: Daniel Conmy & Tyler Bendy
- April 15: George Devine & Keith Ramsey
- April 16: Tyler Bendy & Konrad Saint
- April 22: Spencer Linton, Gary Sheide, & Jason Shepherd
- April 23 (early): Brent Norton & Alex Wolfe
- April 23 (late): Brent Norton & Cameron Coughlan
- April 28: Spencer Linton, Gary Sheide, & Jason Shepherd
- April 29: Spencer Linton, Gary Sheide, & Jason Shepherd
- April 30: Spencer Linton, Gary Sheide, & Jason Shepherd
- May 3: Spencer Linton, Gary Sheide, & Jason Shepherd
- May 5: Sam Ravech
- May 6: Steve Quis & Keith Ramsey
- May 7: Sam Ravech
- May 10: Jordan Bianucci & Ryan Pickens
- May 12: Joe Castellano
- May 13: George Devine
- May 14: No commentators
- May 17: Roxy Bernstein & Andy Lopez
- May 19: Spencer Linton, Gary Sheide, & Jason Shepherd
- May 20: Spencer Linton, Gary Sheide, & Jason Shepherd
- May 21: Mike Couzens & Wes Clements
- May 26: Steve Quis, Keith Ramsey, & Sarah Kezele
- May 27: Steve Quis, Keith Ramsey, & Sarah Kezele
