= 2016 West Coast Conference baseball tournament =

- Teams: 4
- Format: Double-elimination
- Finals site: Banner Island Ballpark; Stockton, CA
- Champions: Saint Mary's (1st title)
- Winning coach: Eric Valenzuela (1st title)
- MVP: Zach Kirtley (Saint Mary's)
- Television: TheW.tv

2016 West Coast Conference baseball standings
| | Conf. | | | | Overall |
| Team | W | | L | PCT | W | | L | PCT |
|---|---|---|---|---|---|---|---|---|
| BYU ‍†‍‍ | 18 | – | 9 | .667 | 37 | – | 17 | .685 |
| Gonzaga ‍†‍‍^{y} | 18 | – | 9 | .667 | 36 | – | 21 | .632 |
| Saint Mary's ‍†‍‡‍^{y} | 18 | – | 9 | .667 | 33 | – | 25 | .569 |
| Pepperdine ‍‍‍ | 16 | – | 11 | .593 | 29 | – | 24 | .547 |
| San Francisco ‍‍‍ | 14 | – | 13 | .519 | 22 | – | 34 | .393 |
| Loyola Marymount ‍‍‍ | 13 | – | 14 | .481 | 26 | – | 27 | .491 |
| San Diego ‍‍‍ | 13 | – | 14 | .481 | 27 | – | 29 | .482 |
| Pacific ‍‍‍ | 12 | – | 15 | .444 | 22 | – | 30 | .423 |
| Santa Clara ‍‍‍ | 10 | – | 17 | .370 | 23 | – | 29 | .442 |
| Portland ‍‍‍ | 3 | – | 24 | .111 | 17 | – | 37 | .315 |
† – Conference champion ‡ – Tournament champion y – Invited to the NCAA tournament As of June 11, 2016; Rankings from Collegiate Baseball

The 2016 West Coast Conference baseball tournament was held from May 26 through 28, 2016 at Banner Island Ballpark in Stockton, California. Saint Mary's won the four team, double-elimination tournament winner to earn the league's automatic bid to the 2016 NCAA Division I baseball tournament.

== Seeding ==
The top four finishers from the regular season will be seeded one through four based on conference winning percentage. The teams will then play a double elimination tournament. This year instead of playing a single championship game, a second championship rematch will be played should it be a match-up of two single loss teams. The change to the championship format moves the tournament championship from ESPNU to TheW.tv.

| Team | W | L | Pct. | GB | Seed |
|---|---|---|---|---|---|
| Saint Mary's | 18 | 9 | .667 | – | 1 |
| BYU | 18 | 9 | .667 | – | 2 |
| Gonzaga | 18 | 9 | .667 | – | 3 |
| Pepperdine | 16 | 11 | .593 | 2 | 4 |
| San Francisco | 14 | 13 | .519 | 4 | – |
| Loyola Marymount | 13 | 14 | .481 | 5 | – |
| San Diego | 13 | 14 | .481 | 5 | – |
| Pacific | 12 | 15 | .444 | 6 | – |
| Santa Clara | 10 | 17 | .370 | 8 | – |
| Portland | 3 | 24 | .259 | 15 | – |

Tiebreakers:

- Saint Mary's gets the #1 seed. Saint Mary's went 2–1 against both BYU and Gonzaga.
- BYU gets the #2 seed. BYU went 2–1 against Gonzaga.
- Gonzaga gets the #3 seed. Gonzaga went 1–2 against both BYU and Saint Mary's.
- LMU finishes tied for sixth in the conference standings, but they get spot #6 by right of a 2–1 record against San Diego.

== Results ==
First round
1 | Saint Mary's | 8
4 | Pepperdine | 7^{(11)}
3 | Gonzaga | 5
2 | BYU | 3
Lower round 1
4 | Pepperdine | 7
2 | BYU | 2

Semi-finals
1 | Saint Mary's | 13
3 | Gonzaga | 4
Lower final
4 | Pepperdine | 4
3 | Gonzaga | 5^{(10)}

Finals
1 | Saint Mary's
3 | Gonzaga

== Box scores ==
=== #4 Pepperdine vs. #1 Saint Mary's ===
Thursday, May 26 3:05 p.m. PDT Broadcasters: Steve Quis, Keith Ramsey, & Sarah Kezele
| Team | 1 | 2 | 3 | 4 | 5 | 6 | 7 | 8 | 9 | 10 | 11 | R | H | E |
|---|---|---|---|---|---|---|---|---|---|---|---|---|---|---|
| #4 Pepperdine | 0 | 1 | 0 | 0 | 0 | 2 | 0 | 2 | 0 | 2 | 0 | 7 | 16 | 0 |
| #1 Saint Mary's | 0 | 0 | 0 | 0 | 0 | 0 | 0 | 5 | 0 | 2 | 1 | 8 | 13 | 2 |
WP: Anthony Gonsolin (3–3) LP: Chandler Blanchard (3–2); Home runs: PEP: Ben Rodriguez (9), Chris Fornaci (5); SMC: Nate Nolan- 2 (9); Attendance: 1,187; Notes: Duration: 3:48; Weather: 81 °F (27 °C), sunny, winds 13 mph to cf Officials: Dan Payne (HP), Greg Charles (1B), Jeff Henrichs (2B), Billy Haze (3B); Boxscore

=== #3 Gonzaga vs. #2 BYU ===
Thursday, May 26 8:15 p.m. PDT Broadcasters: Steve Quis, Keith Ramsey, & Sarah Kezele
| Team | 1 | 2 | 3 | 4 | 5 | 6 | 7 | 8 | 9 | R | H | E |
|---|---|---|---|---|---|---|---|---|---|---|---|---|
| #3 Gonzaga | 0 | 0 | 2 | 0 | 3 | 0 | 0 | 0 | 0 | 5 | 6 | 0 |
| #2 BYU | 0 | 0 | 0 | 0 | 0 | 0 | 1 | 1 | 1 | 3 | 6 | 1 |
WP: Brandon Bailey (9–3) LP: Michael Rucker (11–1); Attendance: 1,187; Notes: Duration: 2:25; Weather: 77 °F (25 °C), clear, winds 14 mph to lf Officials: Randy Sutton (HP), Jeff Henrichs (1B), Patrick Riley (2B), Dan Payne (3B); Boxscore

=== #4 Pepperdine vs. #2 BYU ===
Friday, May 27 12:05 p.m. PDT Broadcasters: Steve Quis, Keith Ramsey, & Sarah Kezele
| Team | 1 | 2 | 3 | 4 | 5 | 6 | 7 | 8 | 9 | R | H | E |
|---|---|---|---|---|---|---|---|---|---|---|---|---|
| #2 BYU | 0 | 0 | 1 | 0 | 0 | 0 | 0 | 0 | 1 | 2 | 8 | 1 |
| #4 Pepperdine | 5 | 0 | 0 | 0 | 0 | 1 | 0 | 1 | X | 7 | 11 | 2 |
WP: Ryan Wilson (2–0) LP: Keaton Cenatiempo (3–2); Home runs: BYU: None; PEP: Manny Jefferson (12); Attendance: 1,127; Notes: Duration: 2:20; 75 °F (24 °C), sunny, winds 12 mph to cf Officials: Greg Charles (HP), Pat Riley (1B), Billy Haze (2B), Randy Sutton (3B); Boxscore

=== #3 Gonzaga vs. #1 Saint Mary's ===
Friday, May 27 3:30 p.m. PDT Broadcasters: Steve Quis, Keith Ramsey, & Sarah Kezele
| Team | 1 | 2 | 3 | 4 | 5 | 6 | 7 | 8 | 9 | R | H | E |
|---|---|---|---|---|---|---|---|---|---|---|---|---|
| #1 Saint Mary's | 2 | 0 | 0 | 0 | 0 | 6 | 4 | 0 | 1 | 13 | 16 | 1 |
| #3 Gonzaga | 1 | 0 | 0 | 1 | 1 | 0 | 0 | 1 | 0 | 4 | 11 | 1 |
WP: Johnny York (7–5) LP: Eli Morgan (10–2); Home runs: SMC: Anthony Villa (7), Ian McLoughlin (3); GON: None; Attendance: 1,127; Notes: Duration: 3:18; Weather: winds to right center Officials: Jeff Henrichs (HP), Billy Haze (1B), Dan Payne (2B), Greg Charles (3B); Boxscore

=== #4 Pepperdine vs. #3 Gonzaga ===
Friday, May 27 7:40 p.m. PDT Broadcasters: Steve Quis, Keith Ramsey, & Sarah Kezele
| Team | 1 | 2 | 3 | 4 | 5 | 6 | 7 | 8 | 9 | 10 | R | H | E |
|---|---|---|---|---|---|---|---|---|---|---|---|---|---|
| #4 Pepperdine | 0 | 0 | 0 | 0 | 2 | 0 | 0 | 0 | 2 | 0 | 4 | 11 | 0 |
| #3 Gonzaga | 0 | 0 | 0 | 1 | 1 | 2 | 0 | 0 | 0 | 1 | 5 | 11 | 0 |
WP: Wyatt Mills (2–1) LP: Max Gamboa (2–9); Home runs: PEP: Brad Anderson (10); GON: Sam Brown (2), Tyler Frost (6 & 7); Attendance: 1,127; Notes: Duration: 3:32; Weather: Light winds Officials: Pat Riley (HP), Dan Payne (1B), Randy Sutton (2B), Jeff Henrichs (3B); Boxscore

=== WCC Championship: #3 Gonzaga vs. #1 Saint Mary's ===
Saturday, May 28 3:05 p.m. PDT Broadcasters: Steve Quis, Keith Ramsey, & Sarah Kezele
| Team | 1 | 2 | 3 | 4 | 5 | 6 | 7 | 8 | 9 | R | H | E |
|---|---|---|---|---|---|---|---|---|---|---|---|---|
| #3 Gonzaga | 0 | 0 | 0 | 0 | 2 | 0 | 0 | 2 | 0 | 4 | 8 | 1 |
| #1 Saint Mary's | 2 | 6 | 0 | 0 | 2 | 0 | 3 | 0 | X | 13 | 13 | 0 |
WP: Cameron Neff (6–3) LP: Calvin LeBrun (5–4); Home runs: GON: Jace Vandebrake (3); SMC: Jackson Thoreson (3); Attendance: 1,542; Notes: Duration: 2:55; Weather: 91 °F (33 °C), partly cloudy, winds 11 mph to lf Officials: Billy Haze (HP), Randy Sutton (1B), Greg Charles (2B), Pat Riley (3B); Boxscore

== All-Tournament Team ==
The following players were named to the All-Tournament Team.

| Pos | Name | Class | School |
|---|---|---|---|
| P | Brandon Bailey | Jr | Gonzaga |
| P | A. J. Puckett | Jr | Pepperdine |
| P | Ryan Wilson | So | Pepperdine |
| C | Bronson Larsen | Jr | BYU |
| C | Nate Nolan | Jr | Saint Mary’s |
| IF | Zach Kirtley | So | Saint Mary’s |
| IF | Anthony Villa | Sr | Saint Mary’s |
| OF | Sam Brown | Jr | Gonzaga |
| OF | Tyler Frost | So | Gonzaga |
| OF | Brett Rasso | So | Saint Mary’s |

=== Most Outstanding Player ===
Zach Kirtley, a Sophomore infielder from Saint Mary's, was named Tournament Most Outstanding Player.
