= 2022 BYU Cougars baseball team =

American college baseball season

2022 BYU Cougars baseball
- Conference: West Coast Conference
- Record: 33–21 (16–11 WCC)
- Head coach: Mike Littlewood (10th season; first 29 games); Trent Pratt (remainder of season)
- Assistant coaches: Trent Pratt (10th season); Brent Haring (10th season); Michael Bradshaw (4th season)
- Home stadium: Larry H. Miller Field

2022 West Coast Conference baseball standings
	Conf.						Overall
Team	W		L		T	PCT	W		L		T	PCT
No. 14 Gonzaga ‍†‍‍^{y}	20	–	7	–	0	.741	36	–	17	–	0	.679
Portland ‍‍‍	17	–	10	–	0	.630	32	–	23	–	0	.582
San Diego ‍‍‡‍^{y}	17	–	10	–	0	.630	36	–	18	–	0	.667
BYU ‍‍‍	16	–	11	–	0	.593	33	–	21	–	0	.611
Loyola Marymount ‍‍‍	14	–	13	–	0	.519	20	–	34	–	1	.373
San Francisco ‍‍‍	14	–	13	–	0	.519	28	–	29	–	0	.491
Pepperdine ‍‍‍	12	–	15	–	0	.444	24	–	26	–	0	.480
Santa Clara ‍‍‍	11	–	16	–	0	.407	24	–	29	–	0	.453
Saint Mary's ‍‍‍	9	–	18	–	0	.333	25	–	30	–	0	.455
Pacific ‍‍‍	5	–	22	–	0	.185	14	–	38	–	0	.269
† – Conference champion ‡ – Tournament champion y – Invited to the NCAA tournament Rankings from D1Baseball

The 2022 BYU Cougars baseball team represented Brigham Young University during the 2022 NCAA Division I baseball season. Mike Littlewood began the season as acting head coach of the Cougars for a tenth consecutive season. However, on April 11 Littlewood announced he was stepping away from BYU Baseball for personal reasons that were undisclosed. Assistant coach Trent Pratt was named acting head coaching for the remainder of the season.

With 22 players returning this season the Cougars were picked to finish second in the WCC Pre-season poll. To conclude the season the WCC hosted the 2022 baseball tournament May 24–28 at Banner Island Ballpark. For the first time in WCC history the tournament expanded to 6 teams. Teams 1 and 2 received byes into the double elimination bracket while 3 played 6 and 4 played 5 in a single elimination first round.

BYU qualified for the tournament as the #4 seed. However the Cougars fell in the tournament's first-round single-elimination game 5–1 to finish the season 33–21, 17–12 under Littlewood and 16–9 under Pratt.

On June 8 BYU removed the interim title from Pratt and announced he'd be the new BYU baseball head coach for future seasons.

== 2022 roster ==
2022 BYU Cougars roster
Pitchers: 3 Boston Mabeus – Sophomore; 6 Mitch McIntyre – Senior; 7 Cooper Vest – Sophomore; 9 Janzen Keisel – Freshman; 12 Ryan Brady – Sophomore; 13 Cy Nielson – Sophomore; 19 Bryce Robison – Sophomore; 21 Jack Sterner – (redshirt) Sophomore; 23 Peyton Cole – Sophomore; 26 Carter Smith – Sophomore; 28 Justis Reiser – Freshman; 31 Reid McLaughlin – Junior; 36 Carter Foss – Freshman; 37 Cooper McKeehan – Sophomore; 39 Traton Staheli – Freshman; 40 Ayden Callahan – Senior; 41 Nate Dahle – Junior; 42 Jake Porter – Freshman	Infielders: 2 Brock Watkins – Sophomore; 4 Andrew Pintar – Sophomore; 5 Ozzie Pratt – Freshman; 8 Bryan Call – Junior; 14 Alex Sardina – Sophomore; 16 Jacob Rogers – Junior; 18 Collin Reuter – Freshman; 25 Austin Deming – Junior; 32 Rockwell Lybbert – Freshman; 34 Max Harper – Sophomore; 35 Jacob Wilk- Junior; 45 Kyler Lester – Freshman	Catchers: 18 Collin Reuter – Freshman; 24 Mason Strong – Freshman; 29 Chase Peterson – Junior; 38 JD Gardner – Freshman; Outfielders: 6 Mitch McIntyre – Senior; 7 Cooper Vest – Freshman; 10 Hayden Leatham – Senior; 11 Chandler Reber – Freshman; 17 Joshua Cowden – Junior; 22 Cole Gambill – Junior; 24 Mason Strong – Freshman; 27 Ryan Sepede – Sophomore; 43 Dawsen Hill – Sophomore; Designated Hitters: 17 Joshua Cowden – Junior

== Schedule ==
2022 BYU Cougars Game Log
Regular Season
February

Date	Opponent	Rank	Site/stadium	Television	Score	Win	Loss	Save	Attendance	Overall record	WCC record
February 18	vs. Indiana State	–	Centennial Park	FloBaseball	2–3	Matt Jachec (1–0)	Jack Sterner (0–1)	Connor Fenlong (1)	N/A	0–1	–
February 19	vs. Marshall	–	Centennial Park	FloBaseball	3–6	Louis Davenport (1–0)	Nate Dahle (0–1)	None	N/A	0–2	–
February 19	vs. Marshall	–	Centennial Park	FloBaseball	3–2	Janzen Keisel (1–0)	Zac Addkison (0–1)	Reid McLaughlin (1)	N/A	1–2	–
February 21	vs. Ohio State	–	Centennial Park	FloBaseball	9–6	Justis Reiser (1–0)	Aaron Funk (0–1)	Reid McLaughlin (2)	N/A	2–2	–
February 24	at Arizona State	–	Phoenix Municipal Stadium	P12+ ASU	4–2	Bryce Robison (1–0)	Christian Bodlovich (0–1)	Reid McLaughlin (3)	2,725	3–2	–
February 25	at Arizona State	–	Phoenix Municipal Stadium	P12 AZ	6–5	Peyton Cole (1–0)	Brock Peery (0–1)	Reid McLaughlin (4)	3,388	4–2	–
February 26	at Arizona State	–	Phoenix Municipal Stadium	P12+ ASU	19–3	Ryan Brady (1–0)	Josh Hansell (0–1)	None	3,872	5–2	–

March

Date	Opponent	Rank	Site/stadium	Television	Score	Win	Loss	Save	Attendance	Overall record	WCC record
March 3	Milwaukee	–	Larry H. Miller Field	byutv.org	6–5	Reid McLaughlin (1–0)	Mike Edwards (0–1)	None	1,100	6–2	–
March 3	Milwaukee	–	Larry H. Miller Field	byutv.org	0–2	Nick Gilhaus (1–0)	Nate Dahle (0–2)	AJ Blubaugh (1)	1,100	6–3	–
March 4	Milwaukee	–	Larry H. Miller Field	byutv.org	8–4	Janzen Keisel (2–0)	Johnny Kelliher (0–1)	None	1,167	7–3	–
March 10	vs. #6 Oklahoma State	–	Globe Life Field	Facebook	8–6	Bryce Robison (2–0)	Victor Mederos (0–1)	Reid McLaughlin (5)	498	8–3	–
March 11	vs. #6 Oklahoma State	–	Globe Life Field	Facebook	0–3	Kale Davis (1–1)	Justis Reiser (1–1)	Trevor Martin (3)	705	8–4	–
March 12	vs. #6 Oklahoma State	–	Globe Life Field	Facebook	5–8	Roman Phansalkar (3–2)	Nate Dahle (0–3)	Trevor Martin (4)	1,062	8–5	–
March 15	at Utah	–	Smith's Ballpark	P12+ UT	10–3	Bryce Robison (3–0)	David Watson (0–1)	None	2,084	9–5	–
March 17	at Portland*	–	Joe Etzel Field	WCC Net	6–2	Jack Sterner (1–1)	Caleb Franzen (1–3)	None	231	10–5	1–0
March 18	at Portland*	–	Joe Etzel Field	WCC Net	1–11	Brett Gillis (4–1)	Janzen Keisel (2–1)	None	307	10–6	1–1
March 19	at Portland*	–	Joe Etzel Field	WCC Net	1–3	Eli Morse (4–0)	Ryan Brady (1–1)	Peter Allegro (6)	309	10–7	1–2
March 22	at Utah Valley	–	UCCU Ballpark	ESPN+	12–5	Bryce Robison (4–0)	Caneron Scudder (0–1)	None	1,676	11–7	–
March 24	#24 Gonzaga*	–	Larry H. Miller Field	byutv.org	11–2	Jack Sterner (2–1)	Gabriel Hughes (4–1)	None	1,884	12–7	2–2
March 25	#24 Gonzaga*	–	Larry H. Miller Field	BYUtv	3–6	Brody Jessee (3–0)	Janzen Keisel (2–2)	None	2,113	12–8	2–3
March 26	#24 Gonzaga*	–	Larry H. Miller Field	BYUtv	4–9	Trystan Vrieling (3–1)	Ryan Brady (1–2)	None	2,373	12–9	2–4
March 29	Washington State	–	Larry H. Miller Field	byutv.org	9–3	Justis Reiser (2–1)	Cam Liss (0–1)	None	385	13–9	–
March 31	at Saint Mary's*	–	Louis Guisto Field	SCS Central	3–4	Jackson Hulett (3–1)	Reid McLaughlin (1–1)	None	111	13–10	2–5

April

Date	Opponent	Rank	Site/stadium	Television	Score	Win	Loss	Save	Attendance	Overall record	WCC record
April 1	at Saint Mary's*	–	Louis Guisto Field	SCS Pacific	12–2	Ryan Brady (2–2)	Ryan Taurek (1–2)	Bryce Robison (1)	97	14–10	3–5
April 2	at Saint Mary's*	–	Louis Guisto Field	SCS Central	3–4	Ryan Sanders (3–1)	Nate Dahle (0–4)	Nathan Schneider (1)	242	14–11	3–6
April 5	at Dixie State	–	Bruce Hurst Field	ESPN+	5–7	Jake Dahle (2–2)	Boston Maebus (0–1)	None	1,951	14–12	–
April 7	Santa Clara*	–	Larry H. Miller Field	byutv.org	5–1	Jack Sterner (3–1)	Cole Kitchen (3–2)	None	1,857	15–12	4–6
April 8	Santa Clara*	–	Larry H. Miller Field	byutv.org	10–0	Bryce Robison (5–0)	Nick Sando (3–2)	None	2,674	16–12	5–6
April 9	Santa Clara*	–	Larry H. Miller Field	byutv.org	9–5	Cy Nielson (1–0)	Jared Feikes (5–2)	None	2,167	17–12	6–6
April 14	at Nebraska	–	Haymarket Park	B1G+	0–1	Tyler Martin (2–0)	Jack Sterner (3–2)	Braxton Bragg (3)	4,382	17–13	–
April 15	at Nebraska	–	Haymarket Park	B1G+	3–2	Cy Nielson (2–0)	Shay Schanaman (2–5)	Reid McLaughlin (6)	5,219	18–13	–
April 15	at Nebraska	–	Haymarket Park	B1G+	7–6	Carter Smith (1–0)	Braxton Bragg (1–4)	Nate Dahle (1)	5,219	19–13	–
April 16	at Nebraska	–	Haymarket Park	B1G+	4–3	Cooper McKeehan (1–0)	Corbin Hawkins (0–1)	Reid McLaughlin (7)	5,005	20–13	–
April 19	at Utah	–	Smith's Ballpark	P12	7–8	Micah Ashman (2–0)	Reid McLaughlin (1–2)	None	1,626	20–14	–
April 21	San Diego*	–	Larry H. Miller Field	byutv.org	11–7	Jack Sterner (4–2)	Garrett Rennie (2–4)	None	1,859	21–14	7–6
April 22	San Diego*	–	Larry H. Miller Field	BYUtv	3–8	Kyle Carr (1–0)	Ryan Brady (2–3)	None	1,317	21–15	7–7
April 23	San Diego*	–	Larry H. Miller Field	BYUtv	3–4	Brycen Mautz (7–1)	Bryce Robison (5–1)	Ryan Kysar (1)	1,884	21–16	7–8
April 26	Utah Valley	–	Larry H. Miller Field	byutv.org	7–0	Peyton Cole (2–0)	Luke McCollough (2–2)	None	2,125	22–16	–
April 28	at San Francisco*	–	Dante Benedetti Diamond at Max Ulrich Field	SCS Atlantic	3–8	Jonah Jenkins (1–3)	Jack Sterner (4–3)	None	178	22–17	7–9
April 29	at San Francisco*	–	Dante Benedetti Diamond at Max Ulrich Field	SCS Pacific	8–9	Adam Shew (3–1)	Cooper McKeehan (1–1)	Josh Mollerus (4)	213	22–18	7–10
April 30	at San Francisco*	–	Dante Benedetti Diamond at Max Ulrich Field	SCS Atlantic	12–4	Bryce Robison (6–1)	Jesse Barron (4–3)	None	300	23–18	8–10

May

Date	Opponent	Rank	Site/stadium	Television	Score	Win	Loss	Save	Attendance	Overall record	WCC record
May 3	at Cal State Fullerton	–	Goodwin Field	ESPN+	10–5	Ayden Callahan (1–0)	Grant Kelly (0–1)	None	868	24–18	–
May 5	at Pepperdine*	–	Eddy D. Field Stadium	SCS Pacific	4–2	Cy Neilson (3–0)	Brandon Llewellyn (3–6)	Nate Dahle (2)	376	25–18	9–10
May 6	at Pepperdine*	–	Eddy D. Field Stadium	WCC Net	6–3	Ayden Callahan (2–0)	Bobby Christy (0–1)	Reid McLaughlin (8)	476	26–18	10–10
May 7	at Pepperdine*	–	Eddy D. Field Stadium	SCS Atlantic	4–2	Nate Dahle (1–4)	Jack Chester (0–1)	Reid McLaughlin (9)	489	27–18	11–10
May 10	Dixie State	–	Larry H. Miller Field	byutv.org	3–2	Janzen Keisel (3–2)	Jacob Taggart (0–2)	Reid McLaughlin (10)	2,192	28–18	–
May 12	Pacific*	–	Larry H. Miller Field	ESPNU	8–7 ^{(12)}	Cooper McKeehan (2–1)	Austin McKinney (0–2)	None	1,507	29–18	12–10
May 13	Pacific*	–	Larry H. Miller Field	byutv.org	9–3	Bryce Robison (7–1)	Hunter Hayes (2–9)	None	1,934	30–18	13–10
May 14	Pacific*	–	Larry H. Miller Field	BYUtv	5–0	Ryan Brady (3–3)	Marv Guarin (1–4)	None	2,312	31–18	14–10
May 17	Utah	–	Larry H. Miller Field	byutv.org	7–12	Bryson Van Sickle (3–0)	Peyton Cole (2–1)	None	3,192	31–19	–
May 19	Loyola Marymount*	–	Larry H. Miller Field	byutv.org	4–3 ^{(10)}	Nate Dahle (4–2)	Quinn Lavelle (0–5)	None	1,688	32–19	15–10
May 20	Loyola Marymount*	–	Larry H. Miller Field	BYUtv	9–3	Ryan Brady (4–3)	Jimmy Galica (1–6)	None	2,780	33–19	16–10
May 21	Loyola Marymount*	–	Larry H. Miller Field	BYUtv	7–17	Quinn Lavelle (1–5)	Ayden Callahan (2–1)	None	2,816	33–20	16–11

2022 West Coast Conference baseball tournament

Date	Opponent	Rank	Site/stadium	Television	Score	Win	Loss	Save	Attendance	Overall record	WCC record
May 24	vs. Loyola Marymount*	–	Banner Island Ballpark	SCS Atlantic	1–5	Diego Barrera (4–3)	Jack Sterner (4–4)	Owen Hackman (5)	586	33–21	–

Rankings from Collegiate Baseball. Parenthesis indicate tournament seedings.
*West Coast Conference games

== Rivalries ==
BYU had two main rivalries on their schedule- the Deseret First Duel vs. Utah and the UCCU Crosstown Clash vs. Utah Valley. Dixie State also played the Cougars for a second consecutive season.

== Radio Information ==
BYU Baseball was once again broadcast as part of the NuSkin BYU Sports Network. BYU Radio 107.9 KUMT served as the flagship station. However, because of some conflicts, some radio broadcasts were App exclusives. Jason Shepherd and Greg Wrubell rotated providing play-by-play. Tuckett Slade served as analyst on most broadcasts.

== TV Announcers ==
- Indiana State: No commentary
- Marshall: No commentary
- Marshall: No commentary
- Ohio State: No commentary
- Arizona State: Matt Venezia & Zach Woolley
- Arizona State: Dominic Cotroneo
- Arizona State: Gareth Kwok & Randy Policar
- Milwaukee: Greg Wrubell & Tuckett Slade
- Milwaukee: Greg Wrubell & Tuckett Slade
- Milwaukee: Jason Shepherd & Tuckett Slade
- Oklahoma State: Greg Wrubell & Tuckett Slade
- Oklahoma State: Greg Wrubell & Tuckett Slade
- Oklahoma State: Greg Wrubell & Tuckett Slade
- Utah: Brian Preece
- Portland: Bryan Sleik & Korey Kier
- Portland: Bryan Sleik & Korey Kier
- Portland: Bryan Sleik
- Utah Valley: Jordan Bianucci & Josh Kallunki
- Gonzaga: Dave McCann, Gary Sheide, & Jason Shepherd
- Gonzaga: Dave McCann & Gary Sheide
- Gonzaga: Dave McCann & Gary Sheide
- Washington State: Dave McCann & Gary Sheide
- Saint Mary's: Ben Ross & Tim Fitzgerald
- Saint Mary's: Tim Fitzgerald
- Saint Mary's: Brian Brownfield & Tim Fitzgerald
- Dixie State: Keric Seegmiller
- Santa Clara: Jason Shepherd & Gary Sheide
- Santa Clara: Dave McCann, Gary Sheide, & Jason Shepherd
- Santa Clara: Dave McCann, Gary Sheide, & Jason Shepherd
- Nebraska: Grant Hansen & Bobby Hessling
- Nebraska DH: Connor Clark & Josh Lill
- Nebraska: Ryan Valenta & Andrew Pfeifer
- Utah: Thad Anderson & Donnie Marbut
- San Diego: Dave McCann, Gary Sheide, & Jason Shepherd
- San Diego: Dave McCann, Gary Sheide, & Jason Shepherd
- San Diego: Dave McCann, Gary Sheide, & Jason Shepherd
- Utah Valley: Dave McCann, Gary Sheide, & Jason Shepherd
- San Francisco: Alex Hutton
- San Francisco: Ben Ross
- San Francisco: Pat Olson
- Cal State Fullerton: Michael Martinez
- Pepperdine: Al Epstein
- Pepperdine: Al Epstein
- Pepperdine: Karl Winter & Austin Hall
- Dixie State: Dave McCann & Gary Sheide
- Pacific: Roy Philpott & Roddy Jones
- Pacific: Dave McCann, Gary Sheide, & Jason Shepherd
- Pacific: Dave McCann, Gary Sheide, & Jason Shepherd
- Utah: Spencer Linton, Gary Sheide, & Jason Shepherd
- Loyola Marymount: Dave McCann, Gary Sheide, & Jason Shepherd
- Loyola Marymount: Dave McCann, Gary Sheide, & Jason Shepherd
- Loyola Marymount: Dave McCann, Gary Sheide, & Jason Shepherd
- Loyola Marymount: Steve Quis & Bryan Sleik

== See also ==
- 2021 BYU Cougars football team
- 2021–22 BYU Cougars men's basketball team
- 2021–22 BYU Cougars women's basketball team
- 2021 BYU Cougars women's soccer team
- 2021 BYU Cougars women's volleyball team
- 2022 BYU Cougars men's volleyball team
- 2022 BYU Cougars softball team
