= 2014 BYU Cougars baseball team =

American college baseball season

2014 BYU Cougars baseball
- Conference: West Coast Conference
- Record: 22–31 (12–15 WCC)
- Head coach: Mike Littlewood (2nd season)
- Assistant coaches: Trent Pratt (2nd season); Brent Haring (2nd season); Jeremy Thomas (2nd season)
- Captains: Brock Whitney; Hayden Nielsen; Chris Howard; Desmond Poulson
- Home stadium: Larry H. Miller Field (8 series); Bruce Hurst Field (1 series); Brent Brown Ballpark (1 game)

2014 West Coast Conference baseball standings
	Conf.				Overall
Team	W		L	PCT	W		L	PCT
No. 12 Pepperdine ‍†‍‡‍^{y}	18	–	9	.667	43	–	18	.705
Loyola Marymount ‍‍‍	17	–	10	.630	32	–	24	.571
Gonzaga ‍‍‍	17	–	10	.630	26	–	29	.473
Santa Clara ‍‍‍	16	–	11	.593	26	–	30	.464
San Diego ‍‍‍	16	–	11	.593	34	–	20	.630
Pacific ‍‍‍	15	–	12	.556	26	–	26	.500
BYU ‍‍‍	12	–	15	.444	22	–	31	.415
San Francisco ‍‍‍	11	–	16	.407	25	–	28	.472
Saint Mary's ‍‍‍	8	–	19	.296	16	–	38	.296
Portland ‍‍‍	5	–	22	.185	11	–	41	.212
† – Conference champion ‡ – Tournament champion y – Invited to the NCAA tournament Rankings from Collegiate Baseball

The 2014 BYU Cougars baseball team represented Brigham Young University in the 2014 NCAA Division I baseball season. Mike Littlewood acted in his 2nd season as head coach of the Cougars. The Cougars came off a season where they exceeded expectations. After being picked to finish sixth, the Cougars finished in a 3-way tie for second and eliminated regular season champion Gonzaga in the WCC tournament. The Cougars would finish 32–21.

For 2014 the Cougars were picked to finish sixth in the WCC 2014 Pre-season rankings. The Cougars played most of their home games at Larry H. Miller Field. However Bruce Hurst Field hosted one BYU home one series in late February, early March, and Brent Brown Ballpark hosted one BYU game. This was the second consecutive year the Cougars used Bruce Hurst Field for one series due weather concerns. The Cougars ended the season 22–31, 12–15 in conference play, and finished 7th in the WCC Standings.

== 2014 Roster ==
2014 BYU Cougars Roster
Pitchers: 6 James Lengal – Junior; 9 Chunner Nyberg – Senior; 11 Kolton Mahoney – Sophomore; 17 Chris Howard – Senior; 19 Desmond Poulson – Senior; 23 Hayden Rogers – Freshman; 25 Jeff Barker – Junior; 27 Arik Mack – Freshman; 29 Brandon Kinser – Junior; 34 Rhett Nelson – Junior; 37 Hayden Parker – Freshman; 38 Brendon Erickson – Sophomore; XX Michael Rucker – Sophomore	Infielders: 3 Brock Whitney – Senior; 5 Hayden Nielsen – Sophomore; 7 Parker Starr – Junior; 8 Dillon Robinson – Junior; 13 Bret Lopez – Senior; 22 Dallen Reber – Sophomore; 26 Trace Hansen – Sophomore; 28 JC Snyder – Junior; 36 Wyatt Padget – Sophomore; 38 Brendon Erickson – Sophomore; 41 Matt Crowder – Sophomore; 42 Mackav Jacobsen – Freshman; 43 Tyler Kendrick – Freshman	Catchers: 10 Dakota Hernandez- Junior; 14 Bronson Larsen – Freshman; 16 Jarrett Jarvis – Junior; 40 Bo Fisher – Junior; Outfielders: 2 Brennon Lund – Freshman; 4 Eric Urry – Sophomore; 12 Kelton Caldwell – Senior; 24 CJ Latham – Freshman; 32 Andy Isom – Junior; 35 Bryan Heward – Junior; 36 Wyatt Padget – Sophomore

== Schedule ==
2014 BYU Cougars Game Log
Regular season
February

Date	Opponent	Rank	Site/stadium	Score	Win	Loss	Save	Attendance	Overall record	WCC record
February 14	vs. Kansas	–	Peoria Sports Complex	4–10	Wes Benjamin (1–0)	Chris Howard (0–1)	None	273	0–1	–
February 15	vs. Kansas	–	Peoria Sports Complex	0–2	Robert Kahana (1–0)	Kolton Mahoney (0–1)	Jordan Piche' (1)	267	0–2	–
February 15	vs. Kansas	–	Peoria Sports Complex	10–11 (10)	Dakota Smith (1–0)	James Lengal (0–1)	None	281	0–3	–
February 17	vs. Kansas	–	Peoria Sports Complex	1–10	Drew Morovick (1–0)	Jeff Barker (0–1)	Jordan Piche' (2)	277	0–4	–
February 20	at Texas A&M-Corpus Christi	–	Whataburger Field	10–2	Desmond Poulson (1–0)	Gavin Williamson (0–1)	None	N/A	1–4	–
February 20	at Texas A&M-Corpus Christi	–	Whataburger Field	1–3	Matt Danton (1–1)	Hayden Rogers (0–1)	Kaleb Keith (1)	2,043	1–5	–
February 21	vs. #19 TCU	–	Whataburger Field	0–10	Brandon Finnegan (2–0)	Kolton Mahoney (0–2)	None	N/A	1–6	–
February 22	vs. UTSA	–	Whataburger Field	1–7	Nolan Trabanino (2–0)	Jeff Barker (0–2)	None	N/A	1–7	–
February 24	at #26 Texas Tech	–	Dan Law Field at Rip Griffin Park	2–4	Dylan Dusek (1–0)	Michael Springer (0–1)	Ryan Moseley (1)	1,863	1–8	–
February 27	Seattle	–	Bruce Hurst Field	7–3	Desmond Poulson (2–0)	Connor Moore (1–1)	None	307	2–8	–
February 28	Seattle	–	Bruce Hurst Field	8–2	Kolton Mahoney (1–2)	Andrew Olson (0–3)	None	N/A	3–8	–
February 28	Seattle	–	Bruce Hurst Field	4–2	Jeff Barker (1–2)	Mac Acker (2–1)	Brandon Kinser (1)	403	4–8	–

March

Date	Opponent	Rank	Site/stadium	Score	Win	Loss	Save	Attendance	Overall record	WCC record
March 4	Utah	–	Larry H. Miller Field	20–3	Desmond Poulson (3–0)	Tanner Banks (1–2)	None	1,904	5–8	–
March 6	at Nicholls State	–	Ray E. Didier Field	5–0	Kolton Mahoney (2–2)	Brandon Jackson (1–1)	None	157	6–8	–
March 7	at Nicholls State	–	Ray E. Didier Field	7–6 (12)	Brandon Kinser (1–0)	Marc Picciola (0–2)	None	221	7–8	–
March 7	at Nicholls State	–	Ray E. Didier Field	2–10	Taylor Byrd (2–1)	Chunner Nyberg (0–1)	None	227	7–9	–
March 8	at Nicholls State	–	Ray E. Didier Field	1–6	Grant Borne (2–1)	Desmond Poulson (3–1)	None	421	7–10	–
March 10	at Dallas Baptist	–	Joan and Andy Horner Ballpark	3–8	Cory Taylor (1–0)	Brandon Kinser (1–1)	None	624	7–11	–
March 13	San Diego*	–	Larry H. Miller Field	7–14	PJ Conlon (3–0)	Desmond Poulson (3–2)	None	844	7–12	0–1
March 14	San Diego*	–	Larry H. Miller Field	1–5	Troy Conyers (3–0)	Jeff Barker (1–3	Lucas Long (1)	1,139	7–13	0–2
March 15	San Diego*	–	Larry H. Miller Field	8–17	Louie Lechich (4–1)	Kolton Mahoney (2–3)	None	1,173	7–14	0–3
March 19	at Fresno State	–	Pete Beiden Field	1–2	Jake Shull (1–1)	Michael Springer (0–2)	Jordan Brink (1)	1,243	7–15	–
March 20	at San Francisco*	–	Dante Benedetti Diamond at Max Ulrich Field	7–8	Houston Hibberd (3–0)	Brandon Kinser (1–2)	None	72	7–16	0–4
March 21	at San Francisco*	–	Dante Benedetti Diamond at Max Ulrich Field	7–5	Jeff Barker (2–3)	Christian Cecilio (2–4)	Kolton Mahoney (1)	150	8–16	1–4
March 22	at San Francisco*	–	AT&T Park	2–5	Grant Goodman (2–2)	Kolton Mahoney (2–4)	Houston Hibberd (3)	200	8–17	1–5
March 25	at Utah	–	Smith's Ballpark	4–3	Brandon Kinser (2–2)	Nick Green (0–1)	None	2,249	9–17	–
March 27	at Saint Mary's*	–	Louis Guisto Field	3–10	Ryan Brockett (4–2)	Desmond Poulson (3–3)	None	91	9–18	1–6
March 28	at Saint Mary's*	–	Louis Guisto Field	4–3	Kolton Mahoney (3–4)	Brad Nease (1–1)	Brandon Kinser (2)	116	10–18	2–6
March 28	at Saint Mary's*	–	Louis Guisto Field	1–6	Cameron Neff (5–2)	Jeff Barker (2–4)	None	116	10–19	2–7

April

Date	Opponent	Rank	Site/stadium	Score	Win	Loss	Save	Attendance	Overall record	WCC record
April 1	Utah Valley	–	Larry H. Miller Field	3–8	Devin Nelson (2–4)	Michael Springer (0–3)	None	783	10–20	–
April 3	Pacific*	–	Larry H. Miller Field	10–1	Desmond Poulson (4–3)	Michael Benson (0–4)	None	395	11–20	3–7
April 4	Pacific*	–	Larry H. Miller Field	9–3	Kolton Mahoney (4–4)	Mike Hager (2–4)	None	931	12–20	4–7
April 5	Pacific*	–	Brent Brown Ballpark	7–11	Jake Jenkins (3–2)	Jeff Barker (2–5)	None	350	12–21	4–8
April 8	at Washington State	–	Gesa Stadium	3–0	Hayden Rogers (1–1)	Sam Triece (1–2)	Brandon Kinser (3)	3,360	13–21	–
April 10	at #24 Pepperdine*	–	Eddy D. Field Stadium	1–0	Brandon Kinser (3–2)	Corey Miller (6–2)	None	345	14–21	5–8
April 11	at #24 Pepperdine*	–	Eddy D. Field Stadium	4–6	Matt Maurer (4–1)	Kolton Mahoney (4–5)	Eric Karch (10)	297	14–22	5–9
April 12	at #24 Pepperdine*	–	Eddy D. Field Stadium	1–9	Aaron Brown (7–1)	Desmond Poulson (4–4)	None	502	14–23	5–10
April 14	at #14 UC Santa Barbara	–	Caesar Uyesaka Stadium	5–9	Andrew Vasquez (1–0)	Hayden Rogers (1–2)	None	290	14–24	–
April 17	Loyola Marymount*	–	Larry H. Miller Field	0–2	Colin Welmon (6–2)	Desmond Poulson (4–5)	None	857	14–25	5–11
April 18	Loyola Marymount*	–	Larry H. Miller Field	6–2	Jeff Barker (3–5)	Sean Buckle (1–4)	None	1,531	15–25	6–11
April 19	Loyola Marymount*	–	Larry H. Miller Field	4–2	Kolton Mahoney (5–5)	J.D. Busfield (0–1)	Brandon Kinser (4)	1,668	16–25	7–11
April 29	at Utah Valley	–	Brent Brown Ballpark	6–4	Hayden Rogers (2–2)	Devin Nelson (3–5)	Brandon Kinser (5)	4,122	17–25	–

May

Date	Opponent	Rank	Site/stadium	Score	Win	Loss	Save	Attendance	Overall record	WCC record
May 1	Gonzaga*	–	Larry H. Miller Field	11–4	Jeff Barker (4–5)	Kenny Smith (1–5)	Hayden Rogers (1)	989	18–25	8–11
May 2	Gonzaga*	–	Larry H. Miller Field	3–4	Brandon Bailey (5–5)	Chris Howard (0–2)	Karl Myers (4)	1,290	18–26	8–12
May 3	Gonzaga*	–	Larry H. Miller Field	4–6	Will Abram (3–1)	Hayden Rogers (2–3)	None	1,139	18–27	8–13
May 6	Utah	–	Larry H. Miller Field	10–12	Josh Chapman (3–0)	Brandon Kinser (0–3)	None	1,065	18–28	–
May 8	Santa Clara*	–	Larry H. Miller Field	6–8	Jason Seever (2–2)	Chris Howard (0–3)	Reece Karalus (11)	721	18–29	8–14
May 9	Santa Clara*	–	Larry H. Miller Field	16–2	Jeff Barker (6–5)	Peter Hendron (6–4)	None	1,112	19–29	9–14
May 10	Santa Clara*	–	Larry H. Miller Field	1–5	Jacob Steffens (2–4)	Kolton Mahoney (5–6)	None	1,169	19–30	9–15
May 13	at Utah	–	Smith's Ballpark	4–5	Josh Chapman (4–0)	Hayden Rogers (2–4)	None	3,800	19–31	–
May 15	at Portland*	–	Joe Etzel Field	11–1	Jeff Barker (6–5)	Colin Feldtman (2–8)	None	333	20–31	10–15
May 16	at Portland*	–	Joe Etzel Field	6–3	Kolton Mahoney (6–6)	Jackson Lockwood (3–3)	Brandon Kinser (6)	343	21–31	11–15
May 17	at Portland*	–	Joe Etzel Field	6–1	Desmond Poulson (5–5)	Chad Kjemhus (1–4)	None	373	22–31	12–15

Rankings from Collegiate Baseball. Parenthesis indicate tournament seedings.
*West Coast Conference games

== TV & Radio Information ==
All home and conference games as well as select non-conference road games (at Utah and at UC Santa Barbara) were broadcast on KOVO with Brent Norton (play-by-play) calling the games for his 25th consecutive season. A rotating selection of analysts will be used. Most of the games were simulcast on BYU Radio.

BYUtv broadcast 9 home games: Mar. 13 & 15 vs. San Diego, Apr. 3 vs. Pacific, Apr. 17 vs. Loyola Marymount, May 1–3 vs. Gonzaga, and May 8 & 10 vs. Santa Clara. Sister station KBYU aired the May 6 home game vs. Utah. BYUtv/KBYU used Spencer Linton and Dave McCann as their play-by-play men. Gary Sheide returned as the analyst. An additional six games aired on the WCC's online station- TheW.tv: Mar. 4 vs. Utah, Mar. 14 vs. San Diego, Apr. 1 vs. Utah Valley, Apr. 18 vs. Loyola Marymount, May 9 vs. Santa Clara, and May 16 at Portland. TheW.tv games were the conference's first non-basketball broadcasts outside the state of California and the first game featuring a non-conference opponent in baseball. Both games at Utah, Mar. 25 & May 13, aired on Pac-12 Network (the Mar. 25 game being a Pac-12 Mountain exclusive), the game at Utah Valley, Apr. 29, aired on UVU's YouTube channel, the 3-game series at Pepperdine will air on TV-32 Malibu and be simulcast online by WavesCast, and the game at Fresno State aired on the Mountain West Network powered by Campus Insiders. Had the Cougars returned to the WCC baseball tournament, the games would have aired on TheW.tv.

== 2014 MLB draft ==
Two BYU Cougar players were selected in the 2014 MLB draft. Both have the option of coming back to BYU should they not sign a contract. Sophomore Pitcher Kolton Mahoney, who just completed his second full year at BYU after serving a church mission to Santa Rosa, California from 2012 to 2013, was selected in the 23rd Round, 686th overall pick, by the Milwaukee Brewers. Shortstop Tanner Chauncey, who was serving a church mission in the Brazil João Pessoa Mission from 2013 to 2014 and would be back for the 2015 season as a sophomore, was selected in the 35th Round, 1,059th overall pick, by the Los Angeles Dodgers.
