= 2019 BYU Cougars baseball team =

American college baseball season

2019 BYU Cougars baseball

2019 Kleberg Bank College Classic Champions
- Conference: West Coast Conference
- Record: 36-17 (19-8 WCC)
- Head coach: Mike Littlewood (7th season)
- Assistant coaches: Trent Pratt (7th season); Brent Haring (7th season); Michael Bradshaw (1st season)
- Home stadium: Larry H. Miller Field

2019 West Coast Conference baseball standings
	Conf.				Overall
Team	W		L	PCT	W		L	PCT
BYU ‍†‍‍	19	–	8	.704	36	–	17	.679
Gonzaga ‍‍‍	18	–	9	.667	31	–	24	.564
Saint Mary's ‍‍‍	17	–	10	.630	35	–	22	.614
Loyola Marymount ‍‍‡‍^{y}	15	–	12	.556	34	–	25	.576
San Francisco ‍‍‍	15	–	12	.556	30	–	26	.536
Pepperdine ‍‍‍	14	–	13	.519	24	–	25	.490
San Diego ‍‍‍	14	–	13	.519	32	–	21	.604
Pacific ‍‍‍	10	–	16	.385	23	–	26	.469
Portland ‍‍‍	7	–	19	.269	25	–	27	.481
Santa Clara ‍‍‍	5	–	22	.185	12	–	40	.231
† – Conference champion ‡ – Tournament champion y – Invited to the NCAA tournament As of June 5, 2019; Rankings from D1Baseball

The 2019 BYU Cougars baseball team represented Brigham Young University in the 2019 NCAA Division I baseball season. Mike Littlewood acted in his seventh season as head coach of the Cougars. After being picked to finish first in the conference in 2018, BYU suffered through a season with many injuries on both sides of play. The end result was a 22–28 season with BYU finishing tied with Pacific at 11–17 for ninth place in conference play. The result led Littlewood to clean house in the off-season, and BYU enters 2019 with 20 new players on the roster: 17 newcomers and 3 returning missionaries. The Cougars were picked to finish sixth in the WCC Pre-season poll.

== 2019 roster ==
2019 BYU Cougars roster
Pitchers: 6 Mitch McIntyre - Sophomore; 9 Easton Walker - Sophomore; 14 Blake Inouye - Senior; 18 Justin Sterner - Sophomore; 21 Jack Sterner - Freshman; 22 Jarod Lessar - Junior; 23 Ryan Brady - Freshman; 24 Drew Zimmerman - Sophomore; 25 Austin Deming - Freshman; 26 Riley Gates - (redshirt) Senior; 29 Jake Porter - Freshman; 31 Reid McLaughlin - Freshman; 34 Jordan Wood - Senior; 36 Cooper Foss - Freshman; 40 Ayden Callahan - Sophomore; 42 Bo Burrup - Senior; 45 Ben Weese - Junior	Infielders: 4 Jackson Cluff - Sophomore; 5 Carson Matthews - Freshman; 7 Hobbs Nyberg - Freshman; 8 Bryan Call - Freshman; 12 DJ McNew - Sophomore; 13 Brian Hsu - Senior; 16 Casey Jacobsen - Senior; 17 Keaton Kringlen - Senior; 25 Austin Deming - Freshman; 28 Zack Peterson - Freshman	Catchers: 2 Noah Hill - Senior; 11 Abraham Valdez - Junior; 19 Koby Kelton - Sophomore; 32 Colton Easton - Freshman; Outfielders: 3 Danny Gelalich - Sophomore; 6 Mitch McIntyre - Sophomore; 7 Hobbs Nyberg - Freshman; 17 Keaton Kringlen - Senior; 19 Koby Kelton - Sophomore; 27 Ryan Sepede - Freshman; 41 Noah Hughes - Freshman; 43 Jaren Hall - Freshman; 44 Brock Hale - Senior

== Schedule ==
2019 BYU Cougars Game Log
Regular Season
February

Date	Opponent	Rank	Site/stadium	Television	Score	Win	Loss	Save	Attendance	Overall record	WCC record
February 15	vs. Northwestern	–	Sloan Park	Facebook	4–3 (10)	Jarod Lessar (1–0)	Josh Levy (0–1)	None	333	1–0	–
February 16	vs. Northwestern	–	Sloan Park	Facebook	2–3	Sam Lawrence (1–0)	Justin Sterner (0–1)	None	333	1–1	–
February 16	vs. Northwestern	–	Sloan Park	Facebook	11–2	Drew Zimmerman (1–0)	Ryan Bader (0–1)	None	333	2–1	–
February 18	vs. Cal	–	Tempe Diablo Stadium	Facebook	6–10	Jack Delmore (1–0)	Ben Weese (0–1)	Sean Sullivan (1)	N/A	2–2	–
February 21	at Texas A&M-Corpus Christi	–	Whataburger Field	Team 1 Sports	6–2	Reid McLaughlin (1–0)	Cody LeCompte (0–1)	None	625	3–2	–
February 22	vs. Ohio State	–	Whataburger Field	Team 1 Sports	5–1	Jordan Wood (1–0)	Seth Lonsway (1–1)	None	309	4–2	–
February 23	vs. Oral Roberts	–	Whataburger Field	Team 1 Sports	8–3	Justin Sterner (1–1)	Landon Odom (0–1)	None	1,375	5–2	–
February 28	at Lamar	–	Vincent-Beck Stadium	Facebook	4–2 (10)	Reid McLaughlin (2–0)	Ryan Erickson (0–1)	Drew Zimmerman (1)	417	6–2	–

March

Date	Opponent	Rank	Site/stadium	Television	Score	Win	Loss	Save	Attendance	Overall record	WCC record
March 1	at Lamar	–	Vincent-Beck Stadium	Facebook	1–3	Jason Blanchard (2–1)	Jarod Lessar (1–1)	AJ Ozorio-Brace (1)	1,091	6–3	–
March 2	at Lamar	–	Vincent-Beck Stadium	Facebook	4–0	Justin Sterner (2–1)	Noah Sills (0–1)	None	712	7–3	–
March 5	Utah Valley	–	Larry H. Miller Field	TheW.tv	5–1	Reid McLaughlin (3–0)	Spenser Triplett (0–1)	None	958	8–3	–
March 7	Milwaukee	–	Larry H. Miller Field	TheW.tv	11–8	Jordan Wood (2–0)	Jared Reklaitis (1–3)	None	985	9–3	–
March 8	Milwaukee	–	Larry H. Miller Field	TheW.tv	14–6 (5)	Jarod Lessar (2–1)	Elijah Goodman (0–1)	None	643	10–3	–
March 8	Milwaukee	–	Larry H. Miller Field	TheW.tv	Cancelled- Snow						
March 9	Milwaukee	–	Larry H. Miller Field	TheW.tv	5–3	Justin Sterner (3–1)	Mike Edwards (2–1)	Reid McLaughlin (1)	989	11–3	–
March 12	Niagara	–	Larry H. Miller Field	TheW.tv	11–5	Mitch McIntyre (1–0)	Jackson Jones (0–1)	None	247	12–3	–
March 14	Gonzaga*	–	Larry H. Miller Field	TheW.tv	2–4 (11)	Alek Jacob (2–2)	Blake Inouye (0–1)	None	913	12–4	0–1
March 15	Gonzaga*	–	Larry H. Miller Field	TheW.tv	7–4	Easton Walker (1–0)	Justin Blatner (1–2)	Drew Zimmerman (2)	965	13–4	1–1
March 16	Gonzaga*	–	Larry H. Miller Field	TheW.tv	2–4	Mac Lardner (1–3)	Justin Sterner (3–2)	Alek Jacob (5)	1,447	13–5	1–2
March 19	at Utah Valley	–	UCCU Ballpark	WAC DN	14–13 (10)	Mitch McIntyre (2–0)	Jesse Schmit (2–2)	None	1,068	14–5	–
March 21	Portland*	–	Larry H. Miller Field	TheW.tv	10–1	Jordan Wood (3–0)	Kevin Baker (0–2)	None	872	15–5	2–2
March 22	Portland*	–	Larry H. Miller Field	Stadium on Livestream	3–1	Easton Walker (2–0)	Eli Morse (2–2)	Drew Zimmerman (3)	867	16–5	3–2
March 23	Portland*	–	Larry H. Miller Field	BYUtv	11–1	Justin Sterner (4–2)	Nate Packard (2–1)	None	1,343	17–5	4–2
March 26	Oregon	–	Larry H. Miller Field	BYUtv.org	7–3	Reid McLaughlin (4–0)	Nico Tellache (3–2)	None	1,594	18–5	–
March 28	Saint Mary's*	–	Larry H. Miller Field	BYUtv.org	10–6	Jordan Wood (4–0)	Kevin Milam (3–3)	Reid McLaughlin (2)	1,358	19–5	5–2
March 29	Saint Mary's*	–	Larry H. Miller Field	TheW.tv	11–0	Easton Walker (3–0)	Ken Waldichuk (3–2)	None	789	20–5	6–2
March 30	Saint Mary's*	–	Larry H. Miller Field	BYUtv	5–3	Justin Sterner (5–2)	Carlos Lomeli (4–2)	None	1,532	21–5	7–2

April

Date	Opponent	Rank	Site/stadium	Television	Score	Win	Loss	Save	Attendance	Overall record	WCC record
April 2	at Utah	#24	Smith's Ballpark	P12	6–8	Jacob Rebar (1–0)	Drew Zimmerman (1–1)	Zac McCleve (1)	1,814	21–6	–
April 4	at San Diego*	#24	Fowler Park	TheW.tv	5–15	Chris Murphy (4–1)	Jordan Wood (4–1)	None	592	21–7	7–3
April 5	at San Diego*	#24	Fowler Park	TheW.tv	5–6 (10)	Grady Miller (3–2)	Mitch McIntyre (2–1)	None	625	21–8	7–4
April 6	at San Diego*	#24	Fowler Park	TheW.tv	17–4	Justin Sterner (6–2)	Jack Dolak (3–3)	Blake Inouye (1)	385	22–8	8–4
April 9	Utah	–	Larry H. Miller Field	BYUtv.org	Cancelled- Rain						
April 11	Pepperdine*	–	Larry H. Miller Field	BYUtv.org	13–7	Reid McLaughlin (5–0)	Christian Stoutland (1–3)	None	991	23–8	9–4
April 12	Pepperdine*	–	Larry H. Miller Field	TheW.tv	4–2	Easton Walker (4–0)	Easton Lucas (3–3)	Drew Zimmerman (4)	2,470	24–8	10–4
April 13	Pepperdine*	–	Larry H. Miller Field	BYUtv	0–7	Jonathan Pendergast (4–2)	Justin Sterner (6–3)	None	1,612	24–9	10–5
April 18	at Washington	–	Husky Ballpark	P12+ UW	0–1	Chris Micheles (3–1)	Reid McLaughlin (5–1)	Stevie Emenuels (2)	387	24–10	–
April 19	at Washington	–	Husky Ballpark	P12+ UW	7–3	Easton Walker (5–0)	Josh Burgmann (3–3)	None	554	25–10	–
April 20	at Washington	–	Husky Ballpark	P12+ UW	4–0	Justin Sterner (7–3)	Chris Micheles (3–2)	Reid McLaughlin (3)	744	26–10	–
April 25	at Pacific*	#29	Klein Family Field	TheW.tv	11–7 (10)	Mitch McIntyre (3–1)	Nic Swanson (1–1)	None	238	27–10	11–5
April 26	at Pacific*	#29	Klein Family Field	TheW.tv	12–1	Easton Walker (6–0)	Hayden Pearce (2–1)	None	365	28–10	12–5
April 27	at Pacific*	#29	Klein Family Field	TheW.tv	5–0	Justin Sterner (8–3)	Ryan Shreve (4–4)	None	352	29–10	13–5
April 29	at Cal	#27	Evans Diamond	P12	2–3	Rogelio Reyes (4–1)	Drew Zimmerman (1–2)	Arman Sabouri (4)	244	29–11	–

May

Date	Opponent	Rank	Site/stadium	Television	Score	Win	Loss	Save	Attendance	Overall record	WCC record
May 2	at Loyola Marymount*	#27	George C. Page Stadium	TheW.tv	1–5	Codie Pavia (4–2)	Jordan Wood (4–2)	Nick Frasso (6)	388	29–12	13–6
May 3	at Loyola Marymount*	#27	George C. Page Stadium	TheW.tv	8–5	Jarod Lessar (3–1)	Josh Agnew (4–4)	Blake Inouye (2)	581	30–12	14–6
May 4	at Loyola Marymount*	#27	George C. Page Stadium	TheW.tv	10–3	Blake Inouye (1–1)	Matt Voelker (1–4)	None	470	31–12	15–6
May 6	at San Diego State	#30	Tony Gwynn Stadium		5–10	Daniel Ritcheson (2–1)	Jarod Lessar (3–2)	None	101	31–13	–
May 9	San Francisco*	#30	Larry H. Miller Field	BYUtv.org	20–3	Jordan Wood (5–2)	Riley Ornido (6–6)	None	1,554	32–13	16–6
May 10	San Francisco*	#30	Larry H. Miller Field	BYUtv	1–9	Scott Parker (7–3)	Easton Walker (6–1)	Alex Pham (6)	3,189	32–14	16–7
May 11	San Francisco*	#30	Larry H. Miller Field	BYUtv	17–9	Blake Inouye (2–1)	Julian Washburn (8–2)	None	2,337	33–14	17–7
May 14	at Utah	#30	Smith's Ballpark	P12	10–3	Reid McLaughlin (6–1)	Zac McCleve (1–5)	None	4,011	34–14	–
May 16	at Santa Clara*	#30	Stephen Schott Stadium	TheW.tv	2–4	Russell Grant II (3–4)	Jordan Wood (5–3)	Eric Lex (4)	415	34–15	17–8
May 17	at Santa Clara*	#30	Stephen Schott Stadium	TheW.tv	7–5	Easton Walker (7–1)	Holden Bernhardt (1–7)	None	531	35–15	18–8
May 18	at Santa Clara*	#30	Stephen Schott Stadium	TheW.tv	2–1	Reid McLaughlin (7–1)	Eric Lex (0–1)	None	395	36–15	19–8

2019 West Coast Conference baseball tournament
May

Date	Opponent	Rank	Site/stadium	Television	Score	Win	Loss	Save	Attendance	Overall record	WCC record
May 23	vs. Loyola Marymount*	#30	Banner Island Ballpark	TheW.tv							–
May 24		#30	Banner Island Ballpark	TheW.tv							–

Rankings from Collegiate Baseball. Parenthesis indicate tournament seedings.
*West Coast Conference games

- The BYU/Gonzaga series was originally scheduled to take place in Spokane, but it was moved to Provo due to the weather.
- The BYU/San Diego State game was originally scheduled to take place at Lake Elsinore Diamond but was moved to Tony Gwynn Stadium.
- After splitting the series with Utah, BYU was awarded the Deseret First Duel trophy via run differential.

== Rivalries ==
BYU has two main rivalries on their schedule- the Deseret First Duel vs. Utah and the UCCU Crosstown Clash vs. Utah Valley. The Cougars will also participate in the Kleberg Bank College Classic.

== Radio Information ==
For the second consecutive season BYU Baseball will be broadcast as part of the NuSkin BYU Sports Network, and for the first time ever every BYU Baseball game will be broadcast on radio. Brent Norton returns to provide play-by-play for his 27th consecutive season, with Jason Shepherd or Greg Wrubell subbing in when Brent is unavailable. Tuckett Slade will provide analysis for most games, but a small selection of former players will also be used. Games will once again be carried on KOVO and BYU Radio. KOVO will have five exclusives (Gm. 1 Feb. 16, Mar. 8, Mar. 12, Mar. 23, and Apr. 6), BYU Radio's KUMT will have one exclusive (Feb. 21), and BYU Radio will carry three others exclusively across all their stations (Gm. 2 Feb. 16, Mar. 7, and Mar. 19). The Mar. 5 game will have hour one only on KOVO before BYU Radio JIP's the game at 7 PM MST. All other games will air on both KOVO and BYU Radio.

== TV Announcers ==
- Feb 15: Jason Shepherd & Tuckett Slade
- Feb 16 (1): Jason Shepherd & Tuckett Slade
- Feb 16 (2): Jason Shepherd & Mason Marshall
- Feb 18: Jason Shepherd & Tuckett Slade
- Feb 21: Chad Keys
- Feb 22: Chad Keys
- Feb 23: Chad Keys
- Feb 26: Harold Mann
- Mar 1: Harold Mann
- Mar 2: No commentary
- Mar 5: Jason Shepherd & Tuckett Slade
- Mar 7: Greg Wrubell & Tuckett Slade
- Mar 8: Jason Shepherd & Tuckett Slade
- Mar 9: Jason Shepherd & Tuckett Slade
- Mar 12: Brent Norton & Tuckett Slade
- Mar 14: Brent Norton & Tuckett Slade
- Mar 15: Brent Norton & Tuckett Slade
- Mar 16: Brent Norton & Tuckett Slade
- Mar 19: Jordan Bianucci & Ryan Pickens
- Mar 21: Brent Norton & Tuckett Slade
- Mar 22: Brent Norton & Tuckett Slade
- Mar 23: Jarom Jordan & Gary Sheide
- Mar 26: Spencer Linton, Gary Sheide, & Jason Shepherd
- Mar 28: Spencer Linton, Gary Sheide, & Jason Shepherd
- Mar 29: Brent Norton & Tuckett Slade
- Mar 30: Spencer Linton, Gary Sheide, & Jason Shepherd
- Apr 2: J.B. Long & Javy López
- Apr 4: Jack Murray & John "JC" Cunningham
- Apr 5: Steve Quis, Alex Jensen, & Sammy O'Brien
- Apr 6: Jack Murray & John Cunningham
- Apr 11: Spencer Linton, Gary Sheide, & Jason Shepherd
- Apr 12: Greg Wrubell & Tuckett Slade
- Apr 13: Spencer Linton, Gary Sheide, & Jason Shepherd
- Apr 18: Bill Abelson
- Apr 19: Bill Abelson
- Apr 20: Bill Abelson
- Apr 25: Ben Ross
- Apr 26: Jeff Dominick
- Apr 27: Jeff Dominick
- Apr 29: Roxy Bernstein & Dean Stotz
- May 2: Chris Turkmany
- May 3: Sam Farber, Keith Benjamin, & Sammy O'Brien
- May 4: Chris Turkmany & Jim Collins
- May 9: Spencer Linton, Gary Sheide, & Jason Shepherd
- May 10: Spencer Linton, Gary Sheide, & Jason Shepherd
- May 11: Dave McCann, Gary Sheide, & Jason Shepherd
- May 14: J.B. Long & Dean Stotz
- May 16: David Gentile
- May 17: David Gentile
- May 18: David Gentile
- May 23: Steve Quis, Alex Jensen, & Sammy O'Brien
- May 24: Steve Quis, Alex Jensen, & Sammy O'Brien
