= 2014 West Coast Conference baseball tournament =

Baseball Tournament held in California, 2014

- 2014 WCC Tournament Logo
- Teams: 4
- Format: Double-elimination
- Finals site: Banner Island Ballpark; Stockton, CA
- Champions: Pepperdine (16th title)
- Winning coach: Steve Rodriguez (5th title)
- MVP: Aaron Brown (Pepperdine)
- Attendance: 1,131
- Television: Preliminaries: TheW.tv; Championship: ESPNU

2014 West Coast Conference baseball standings
	Conf.				Overall
Team	W		L	PCT	W		L	PCT
No. 12 Pepperdine ‍†‍‡‍^{y}	18	–	9	.667	43	–	18	.705
Loyola Marymount ‍‍‍	17	–	10	.630	32	–	24	.571
Gonzaga ‍‍‍	17	–	10	.630	26	–	29	.473
Santa Clara ‍‍‍	16	–	11	.593	26	–	30	.464
San Diego ‍‍‍	16	–	11	.593	34	–	20	.630
Pacific ‍‍‍	15	–	12	.556	26	–	26	.500
BYU ‍‍‍	12	–	15	.444	22	–	31	.415
San Francisco ‍‍‍	11	–	16	.407	25	–	28	.472
Saint Mary's ‍‍‍	8	–	19	.296	16	–	38	.296
Portland ‍‍‍	5	–	22	.185	11	–	41	.212
† – Conference champion ‡ – Tournament champion y – Invited to the NCAA tournament Rankings from Collegiate Baseball

The 2014 West Coast Conference baseball tournament was held from May 22 through 24 at Banner Island Ballpark in Stockton, California. The four team, double-elimination tournament, outside of the championship game, which is winner takes all, winner earned the league's automatic bid to the 2014 NCAA Division I baseball tournament. The NCAA approved the use of experimental instant replay rules during the event. These rules are generally only in force during the College World Series, and allow umpires to use video to review fair/foul, home run, and spectator interference calls. The WCC made history in the Gonzaga/ Santa Clara elimination game (Game 3) when they had the first collegiate baseball review in history. The feat would be repeated in the WCC Championship, marking the second time replay has been used in a collegiate baseball game.

== Seeding ==
The top four finishers from the regular season were seeded one through four based on conference winning percentage. The teams then played a double elimination tournament, outside of the championship game, which was winner takes all.

Team	W	L	Pct.	GB	Seed
Pepperdine	18	9	.667	–	1
x-Loyola Marymount	17	10	.630	1	2
x-Gonzaga	17	10	.630	1	3
y-Santa Clara	16	11	.593	2	4
y-San Diego	16	11	.593	2	–
Pacific	15	12	.556	3	–
BYU	12	15	.444	6	–
San Francisco	11	16	.407	7	–
Saint Mary's	8	19	.296	10	–
Portland	5	22	.185	13	–

Tiebreakers:
x- Loyola Marymount claimed the #2 seed over Gonzaga by right of a 2–1 record against the Zags.
y- Santa Clara claimed the #4 seed over San Diego by right of a 3–0 record against the Toreros.

== Results ==
First round
1	Pepperdine	5
4	Santa Clara	2
2	Loyola Marymount	5
3	Gonzaga	1
Lower round 1
4	Santa Clara	6
3	Gonzaga	8

Semi-finals
1	Pepperdine	4
2	Loyola Marymount	1
Lower final
3	Gonzaga	4
2	Loyola Marymount	7

Finals
1	Pepperdine
2	Loyola Marymount

== Box scores ==
=== #4 Santa Clara vs. #1 Pepperdine ===
Pepperdine Opens WCC Championship with a 5–2 Win vs. Santa Clara

Thursday, May 22 3:06 p.m. PDT Broadcasters: Andy Masur, Keith Ramsey & Amanda Blackwell (TheW.tv)
Team	1	2	3	4	5	6	7	8	9	R	H	E
#4 Santa Clara	0	2	0	0	0	0	0	0	0	2	6	0
#1 Pepperdine	0	0	0	3	0	0	0	2	X	5	10	1
WP: Corey Miller (8–4) LP: D.J. Zapata (3–8) Sv: Eric Karch (6); Home runs: SCU: Quinton Perry (6); PEPP: None; Attendance: 842; Notes: Duration: 2:19; Weather: 84 °F (29 °C), clear, winds 6mph LC; Officials: Stephen Fritzoni (HP), Dale Luker (1B), Timothy Vessey (2B), Jeff Henrichs (3B), Ruben Candelaria (RF), Billy Haze (LF); Boxscore

=== #3 Gonzaga vs. #2 Loyola Marymount ===
Loyola Marymount Dispatches Gonzga 5–1 in game Two of WCC Baseball Championship

Thursday, May 22 7:07 p.m. PDT Broadcasters: Andy Masur, Keith Ramsey & Amanda Blackwell (TheW.tv)
Team	1	2	3	4	5	6	7	8	9	R	H	E
#3 Gonzaga	0	0	1	0	0	0	0	0	0	1	6	0
#2 Loyola Marymount	0	0	0	2	0	3	0	0	X	5	9	1
WP: Colin Welmon (10–2) LP: Brandon Bailey (6–7); Attendance: 842; Notes: Duration: 2:29; Weather: 80 °F (27 °C), clear, winds 13mph LC; Officials: Ruben Candelaria (HP), Timothy Vessey (1B), Billy Haze (2B), Dale Luker (3B), Stephen Fritzoni (RF), Jeff Henrichs (LF); Boxscore

=== #4 Santa Clara vs. #3 Gonzaga ===
Gonzaga Eliminates Santa Clara in Day Two of WCC Championship

Friday, May 23 12:05 p.m. PDT Broadcasters: Andy Masur, Keith Ramsey & Amanda Blackwell (TheW.tv)
Team	1	2	3	4	5	6	7	8	9	R	H	E
#3 Gonzaga	0	1	0	0	2	4	0	0	1	8	8	2
#4 Santa Clara	1	0	2	0	1	2	0	0	0	6	11	0
WP: Andrew Spoko (5–4) LP: Jacob Steffens (2–5) Sv: Karl Myers (5); Attendance: 912; Notes: Duration: 3:15; Weather: 78 °F (26 °C), sunny, winds 10mph RC; Officials: Dale Luker (HP), Stephen Fritzoni (1B), Jeff Henrichs (2B), Billy Haze (3B), Timothy Vessey (RF), Ruben Candelaria (LF); Boxscore

=== #1 Pepperdine vs. #2 Loyola Marymount ===
Pepperdine Advances to WCC Championship Title Game after 4–1 Win vs. Loyola Marymount

Friday, May 23 4:31 p.m. PDT Broadcasters: Andy Masur, Keith Ramsey & Amanda Blackwell (TheW.tv)
Team	1	2	3	4	5	6	7	8	9	R	H	E
#2 Loyola Marymount	0	1	0	0	0	0	0	0	0	1	5	1
#1 Pepperdine	0	0	0	2	0	0	0	2	X	4	10	1
WP: Aaron Brown (11–1) LP: Patrick McGrath (6–3) Sv: Eric Karch (13); Home runs: LMU: None; PEPP: Brad Anderson (5); Attendance: 912; Notes: Duration: 3:03; Weather: 87 °F (31 °C), sunny, winds 15mph C Officials: Timothy Vessey (HP), Jeff Henrichs (1B), Ruben Candelaria (2B), Stephen Fritzoni (3B), Billy Haze (RF), Dale Luker (LF); Boxscore

=== #3 Gonzaga vs. #2 Loyola Marymount ===
Lions Set for Rematch with #29 Pepperdine for WCC Championship

Friday, May 23 8:12 p.m. PDT Broadcasters: Andy Masur, Keith Ramsey & Amanda Blackwell (TheW.tv)
Team	1	2	3	4	5	6	7	8	9	R	H	E
#2 Loyola Marymount	3	0	0	2	0	0	0	2	0	7	9	1
#3 Gonzaga	0	0	1	0	1	0	0	0	2	4	8	3
WP: J.D. Busfield (1–2) LP: Taylor Jones (4–3); Attendance: 912; Notes: Duration: 3:13; Weather: 82 °F (28 °C), clear, winds 12mph LC; Officials: Billy Haze (HP), Timothy Vessey (1B), Dale Luker (2B), Ruben Candelaria (3B), Jeff Henrichs (RF), Stephen Fritzoni (LF)

=== WCC Championship: #2 Loyola Marymount vs. #1 Pepperdine ===
Saturday, May 24 7:04 p.m. PDT Broadcasters: Roxy Bernstein and Randy Flores (ESPNU)
Team	1	2	3	4	5	6	7	8	9	R	H	E
#1 Pepperdine	0	0	0	0	0	3	1	2	0	6	8	0
#2 Loyola Marymount	0	0	0	0	0	1	0	0	0	1	8	0
WP: Jackson McClelland (8–3) LP: Brenton Arriaga (4–5); Attendance: 1,638; Notes: Duration: 3:09; Weather: 87 °F (31 °C), clear, winds 15mph LC; Officials: Jeff Henrichs (HP), Billy Haze (1B), Timothy Vessey (2B), Dale Luker (3B), Stephen Fritzoni (RF), Ruben Candelaria (LF); Boxscore

== All-Tournament Team ==
The following players were named to the All-Tournament Team.

Name	School	Pos
Brad Anderson	Pepperdine	IF
Aaron Brown	Pepperdine	LHP/OF
Payden Cawley Lamb	Gonzaga	OF
Tanner Donnels	Loyola Marymount	OF
David Fletcher	Loyola Marymount	IF
Manny Jefferson	Pepperdine	IF
Eric Karch	Pepperdine	RHP
Quinton Perry	Santa Clara	IF
Kenny Smith	Gonzaga	RHP
Colin Welmon	Loyola Marymount	RHP

=== Most Outstanding Player ===
Aaron Brown was named Tournament Most Outstanding Player. Brown was a pitcher and an outfielder for Pepperdine who won Friday's game to make the championship and ended his regular season 11–1. Brown would pitch 8 innings and get 7 strikeouts while giving up only 1 run and 5 hits. In the championship Brown would play center field and go 1 for 4 with 1 hit and 1 RBI while scoring another run for the Waves. In the first game in the tournament Brown would go 2 for 4 with 2 hits and scored one run for the Waves. His .375 batting average would end up as the highest batting percentage during the 2014 tournament.
