= 2019 West Coast Conference baseball tournament =

- Teams: 4
- Format: Double-elimination
- Finals site: Banner Island Ballpark; Stockton, CA
- Champions: Loyola Marymount (3rd title)
- Winning coach: Jason Gill (1st title)
- MVP: Codie Paiva ((Loyola Marymount))
- Television: TheW.tv

2019 West Coast Conference baseball standings
	Conf.				Overall
Team	W		L	PCT	W		L	PCT
BYU ‍†‍‍	19	–	8	.704	36	–	17	.679
Gonzaga ‍‍‍	18	–	9	.667	31	–	24	.564
Saint Mary's ‍‍‍	17	–	10	.630	35	–	22	.614
Loyola Marymount ‍‍‡‍^{y}	15	–	12	.556	34	–	25	.576
San Francisco ‍‍‍	15	–	12	.556	30	–	26	.536
Pepperdine ‍‍‍	14	–	13	.519	24	–	25	.490
San Diego ‍‍‍	14	–	13	.519	32	–	21	.604
Pacific ‍‍‍	10	–	16	.385	23	–	26	.469
Portland ‍‍‍	7	–	19	.269	25	–	27	.481
Santa Clara ‍‍‍	5	–	22	.185	12	–	40	.231
† – Conference champion ‡ – Tournament champion y – Invited to the NCAA tournament As of June 5, 2019; Rankings from D1Baseball

The 2019 West Coast Conference baseball tournament was held from May 23 through 25 at Banner Island Ballpark in Stockton, California. The four team, double-elimination tournament winner, Loyola Marymount, earned the league's automatic bid to the 2019 NCAA Division I baseball tournament.

== Seeding ==
The top four finishers from the regular season were seeded one through four based on conference winning percentage. The teams then played a double elimination tournament.

Team	W	L	Pct.	GB	Seed
BYU	19	8	.704	—	1
Gonzaga	18	9	.667	1	2
Saint Mary's	17	10	.630	2	3
Loyola Marymount	15	12	.556	4	4
San Francisco	15	12	.556	4	—
Pepperdine	14	13	.378	5	—
San Diego	14	13	.519	5	—
Pacific	10	16	.385	8.5	—
Portland	7	19	.269	10.5	—
Santa Clara	5	22	.185	14	—

Tiebreakers:

Loyola Marymount went 2–1 vs. San Francisco to win the #4 seed.
Pepperdine went 2–1 vs. San Diego to finish 6th.
Pacific and Portland only played 26 conference matches as their final scheduled match was rained out. It wasn't rescheduled because it didn't affect the conference tournament.

== Bracket ==
First round
1	BYU	1
4	Loyola Marymount	4
Winner's bracket
2	Gonzaga	3
3	Saint Mary's	7
1	BYU	1
2	Gonzaga	3
Loser's bracket

Semi-finals
4	Loyola Marymount	3
3	Saint Mary's	2
2	Gonzaga	3
3	Saint Mary's	4

Finals
4	Loyola Marymount	4 ^{(10)}	—
3	Saint Mary's	2	—

== Schedule ==
Game	Time*	Matchup^{#}	Television	TV Announcers	Attendance
Thursday, May 23
1	3:00 p.m.	#1 BYU Cougars vs. #4 Loyola Marymount Lions	TheW.tv	Steve Quis, Alex Jensen, & Sammy O'Brien	1,606
2	7:00 p.m.	#2 Gonzaga Bulldogs vs. #3 Saint Mary's Gaels	TheW.tv	Steve Quis, Alex Jensen, & Sammy O'Brien	1,606
Friday, May 24
3	12:00 p.m.	#1 BYU Cougars vs. #2 Gonzaga Bulldogs	TheW.tv	Steve Quis, Alex Jensen, & Sammy O'Brien	1,589
4	3:30 p.m.	#3 Saint Mary's Gaels vs. #4 Loyola Marymount Lions	TheW.tv	Steve Quis, Alex Jensen, & Sammy O'Brien	1,589
5	7:30 p.m.	#2 Gonzaga Bulldogs vs. #3 Saint Mary's Gaels	TheW.tv	Steve Quis, Alex Jensen, & Sammy O'Brien	1,589
Championship – Saturday, May 25
6	3:00 p.m.	#4 Loyola Marymount Lions vs. #3 Saint Mary's Gaels	TheW.tv	Steve Quis, Alex Jensen, & Sammy O'Brien	1,722
7 (If Necessary)	7:00 p.m.	N/A			
*Game times in Pacific Time. # – Rankings denote tournament seed.

== Conference championship ==
West Coast Conference Championship
(4) Loyola Marymount Lions	vs.	(3) Saint Mary's Gaels

May 25, 2019, 3:00 p.m. (PDT) at Banner Island Ballpark in Stockton, California
Team	1	2	3	4	5	6	7	8	9	10	R	H	E
(4) Loyola Marymount	0	1	0	0	0	1	0	0	0	2	4	11	1
(3) Saint Mary's	0	0	0	0	2	0	0	0	0	0	2	5	1
WP: Matt Voelker (2–4) LP: Nathan Schneider (2–1) Sv: Nick Frasso (8); Attendance: 1,722

== All-Tournament Team ==
The following players were named to the All-Tournament Team.

Pos	Name	Class	School
P	Codie Paiva	Senior	Loyola Marymount
P	Nick Frasso	Sophomore	Loyola Marymount
P	Tyler Thornton	Freshman	Saint Mary's
P	Carlos Lomeli	Freshman	Saint Mary's
P	Dalton Ponce	Freshman	Saint Mary's
C			
IF	Trevin Esquerra	Junior	Loyola Marymount
IF	Nick Sogard	Junior	Loyola Marymount
OF			

=== Most Outstanding Player ===
Codie Paiva (LMU) was named the Most Outstanding Player of the WCC Baseball Tournament.
