= 2022 West Coast Conference baseball tournament =

- Teams: 6
- Format: Double-elimination
- Finals site: Banner Island Ballpark; Stockton, CA
- Champions: San Diego
- Television: Stadium College Sports

2022 West Coast Conference baseball standings
	Conf.						Overall
Team	W		L		T	PCT	W		L		T	PCT
No. 14 Gonzaga ‍†‍‍^{y}	20	–	7	–	0	.741	36	–	17	–	0	.679
Portland ‍‍‍	17	–	10	–	0	.630	32	–	23	–	0	.582
San Diego ‍‍‡‍^{y}	17	–	10	–	0	.630	36	–	18	–	0	.667
BYU ‍‍‍	16	–	11	–	0	.593	33	–	21	–	0	.611
Loyola Marymount ‍‍‍	14	–	13	–	0	.519	20	–	34	–	1	.373
San Francisco ‍‍‍	14	–	13	–	0	.519	28	–	29	–	0	.491
Pepperdine ‍‍‍	12	–	15	–	0	.444	24	–	26	–	0	.480
Santa Clara ‍‍‍	11	–	16	–	0	.407	24	–	29	–	0	.453
Saint Mary's ‍‍‍	9	–	18	–	0	.333	25	–	30	–	0	.455
Pacific ‍‍‍	5	–	22	–	0	.185	14	–	38	–	0	.269
† – Conference champion ‡ – Tournament champion y – Invited to the NCAA tournament Rankings from D1Baseball

The 2022 West Coast Conference baseball tournament was held from May 25 through 28 at Banner Island Ballpark in Stockton, California. The tournament winner, the San Diego Toreros, earned the league's automatic bid to the 2022 NCAA Division I baseball tournament.

== Seeding ==
The top six finishers from the regular season were seeded one through six based on conference winning percentage. Teams 1 and 2 received a bye into the double elimination bracket, while 3 plays 6 and 4 plays 5 in a single elimination first round.

Team	W	L	Pct.	GB	Seed
Gonzaga	20	7	.741	—	1
Portland	17	10	.630	3	2
San Diego	17	10	.630	3	3
BYU	16	11	.593	4	4
Loyola Marymount	14	13	.519	6	5
San Francisco	14	13	.519	6	6
Pepperdine	12	15	.444	8	—
Santa Clara	11	16	.407	9	—
Saint Mary's	9	18	.333	11	—
Pacific	5	22	.185	15	—

Tiebreakers:

Portland went 2–1 vs. San Diego to win the #2 seed and give San Diego the #3.
Loyola Marymount went 2–1 vs. San Francisco to win the #5 seed and give San Francisco the #6.

== Results ==
=== Play-in round ===
Wednesday, May 25
Team	R
#6 San Francisco	5
#3 San Diego	10

Wednesday, May 25
Team	R
#5 Loyola Marymount	5
#4 BYU	1

=== Double-elimination round ===
First round
1	Gonzaga	16
5	Loyola Marymount	2
2	Portland	8
3	San Diego	22
Lower round 1
5	Loyola Marymount	2
2	Portland	10

Semi-finals
1	Gonzaga	3
3	San Diego	5
Lower final
2	Portland	0
1	Gonzaga	7

Finals
3	San Diego	15	—
1	Gonzaga	12^{(11)}	—

== Schedule ==
In addition to the tv channels listed, all matches will be streamed on WCC Network.

Game	Time*	Matchup^{#}	Television	TV Announcers	Attendance
Wednesday, May 25
1	3:00 p.m.	#3 San Diego vs. #6 San Francisco	SCS Atlantic	Steve Quis & Bryan Sleik	407
2	7:45 p.m.	#4 BYU vs. #5 Loyola Marymount	SCS Atlantic	Steve Quis & Bryan Sleik	586
Thursday, May 26
3	3:00 p.m.	#1 Gonzaga vs. #5 Loyola Marymount	SCS Atlantic	Steve Quis & Bryan Sleik	914
4	7:00 p.m.	#2 Portland vs. #3 San Diego	SCS Atlantic	Steve Quis & Bryan Sleik	485
Friday, May 27
5	12:00 p.m.	#5 Loyola Marymount vs. #2 Portland	SCS Pacific	Steve Quis & Bryan Sleik	190
6	3:30 p.m.	#1 Gonzaga vs. #3 San Diego	SCS Pacific	Steve Quis & Bryan Sleik	130
7	7:30 p.m.	#2 Portland vs. #1 Gonzaga	SCS Pacific	Steve Quis & Bryan Sleik	130
Championship – Saturday, May 28
8	3:00 p.m.	#3 San Diego vs. #1 Gonzaga	SCS Pacific	Steve Quis & Bryan Sleik	865
9 (If Necessary)	7:00 p.m.	N/A			
*Game times in Pacific Time. # – Rankings denote tournament seed.

== Conference championship ==
West Coast Conference Championship
(3) San Diego Toreros	vs.	(1) Gonzaga Bulldogs

May 25, 2022, 3:00 p.m. (PDT) at Banner Island Ballpark in Stockton, California
Team	1	2	3	4	5	6	7	8	9	10	11	R	H	E
(3) San Diego	2	3	0	1	0	0	0	6	0	0	3	15	12	0
(1) Gonzaga	5	0	2	0	0	0	3	1	1	0	0	12	18	2
WP: Kyle Carr (2–1) LP: Nico Zeglin (2–1); Home runs: USD: Cody Jefferies, Jack Costello; GON: Cade McGee, Grayson Sterling; Attendance: 865
