= Dante Benedetti =

American restaurateur and baseball coach (1919–2005)

Dante Benedetti (May 16, 1919 – November 16, 2005) was an American restaurateur and collegiate baseball coach. He was born in San Francisco and remained there the rest of his life. His family owned New Pisa, a restaurant in San Francisco's North Beach neighborhood. He loved baseball and coached at the University of San Francisco for 29 years. USF's current baseball field is named after him. Benedetti, with 373 wins, was San Francisco's all-time winningest coach until Nino Giarratano surpassed him in 2012.
