= Eric Valenzuela =

American baseball player and coach

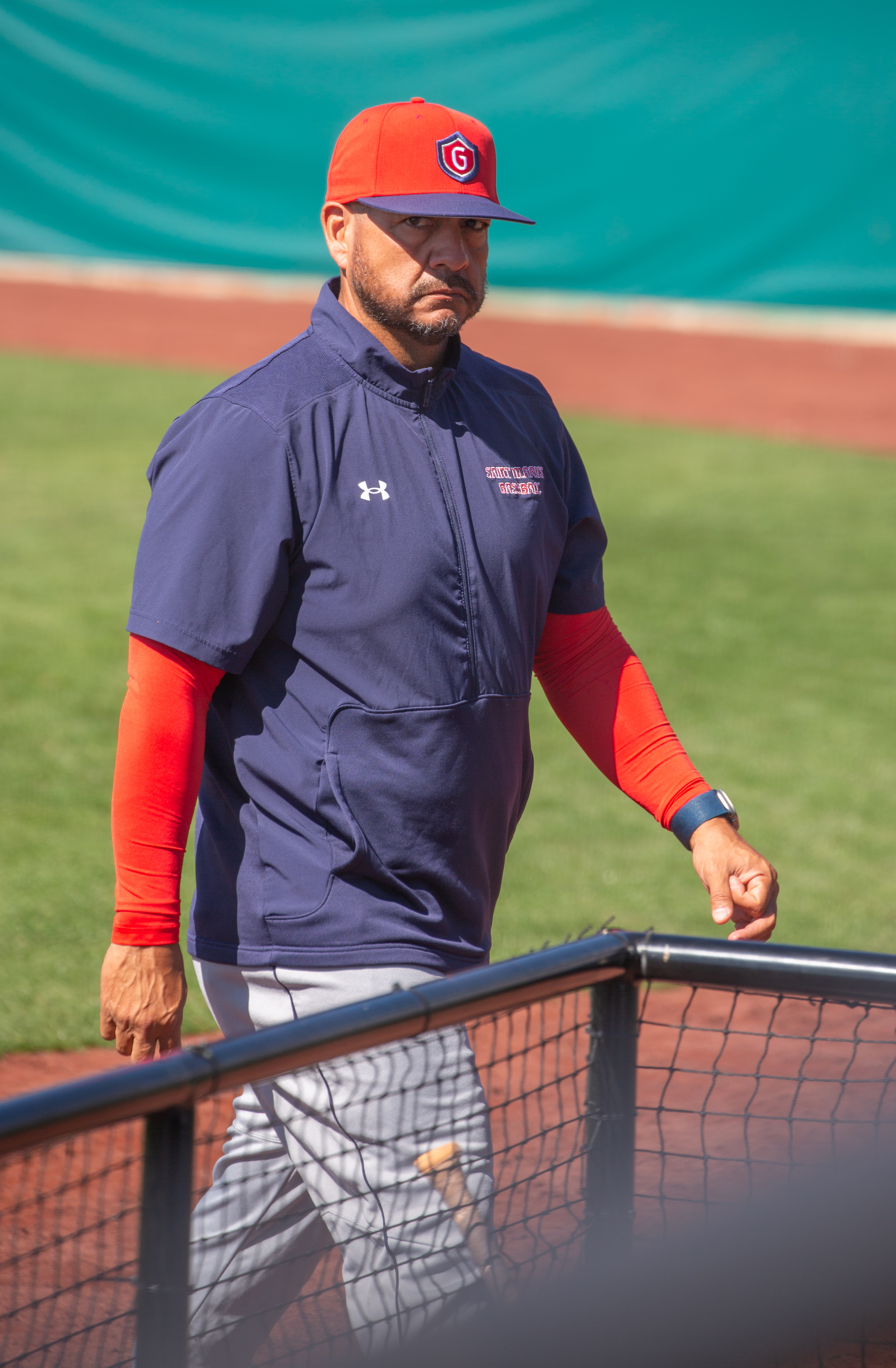
- Valenzuela at Excite Ballpark in Feb 2026

Current position
- Title: Head coach
- Team: Saint Mary’s
- Conference: West Coast
- Record: 287–232 (.553)

Biographical details
- Born: July 22, 1978 (age 48); Covina, California, U.S.

Playing career
- 1997: Arizona State
- 1999–2001: Pepperdine
- Position: Pitcher

Coaching career (HC unless noted)
- 2002–2003: Saint Mary's (asst.)
- 2004–2009: San Diego (asst.)
- 2010–2013: San Diego State (asst.)
- 2014–2019: Saint Mary’s
- 2020–2023: Long Beach State
- 2024–present: Saint Mary’s

Head coaching record
- Overall: 387–301 (.563)
- Tournaments: 5–7 (NCAA)

Accomplishments and honors

Championships
- 2 WCC Tournament (2016, 2025); WCC regular season (2016)

Awards
- WCC Coach of the Year (2016)

Eric Matthew Valenzuela (born July 22, 1978) in an American baseball coach and former pitcher, who is the current head baseball coach of the Saint Mary's Gaels. He played college baseball at Arizona State in 1997 before transferring to Pepperdine where he played from 1999 to 2001. He then served as the head coach of the Saint Mary's from 2014 until 2019 and at Long Beach State between 2019 and 2023.

== Early life and education ==
Born and raised in Covina, California, Valenzuela graduated from Bishop Amat Memorial High School. A pitcher, Valenzuela attended Arizona State University from 1996 to 1998 and played as a true freshman with the Arizona State Sun Devils baseball team in 1997, with 3.0 innings pitched in two appearances. Valenzuela redshirted during the 1998 season, during which Arizona State made the College World Series. Among his teammates at Arizona State were future NFL quarterback Chad Pennington and future MLB outfielder Willie Bloomquist. Valenzuela transferred to Pepperdine for the remainder of his college career, which spanned from 1999 to 2001.

As a sophomore at Pepperdine in 1999, Valenzuela made three appearances with 1.2 innings pitched on a team that won the West Coast Conference West Division and made the NCAA Regional Finals. In 2000, Valenzuela made 16 appearances with 13 starts and one complete game, with a 5–4 record and 4.20 ERA and helped Pepperdine win a second straight WCC West Division title. Valenzuela made 13 appearances with seven starts with a 1–2 record and team-worst 7.20 ERA, as a senior on the 2001 Pepperdine team that won not only a third straight WCC West Division title but also the WCC tournament that automatically qualified the team for the NCAA tournament. Valenzuela graduated from Pepperdine in 2001 with a bachelor's degree in criminal justice.

== Coaching career ==
=== Assistant coach (2002–2013) ===
From 2002 to 2003, Valenzuela served as an assistant at Saint Mary's under John Baptista. He then served as pitching coach at the University of San Diego (USD) under Rich Hill from 2004 to 2009, during which USD made three straight NCAA tournaments from 2006 to 2008 and won back-to-back WCC regular season and tournament titles combined in 2007 and 2008. At USD, Valenzuela built two nationally recognized recruiting classes, first in 2006 named among "Dandy Dozen" by Baseball America and the 2008 class that Baseball America ranked as the best nationally. He also coached 2008 WCC Pitcher of the Year and fourth overall selection in the MLB draft Brian Matusz, in addition to other future Major Leaguers A. J. Griffin and Sammy Solis.

On September 15, 2009, rival San Diego State hired Valenzuela to be pitching coach on the staff of Tony Gwynn. Serving as pitching coach from 2010 to 2013, Valenzuela brought in two recruiting classes in 2010 and 2011 ranked in the Baseball America top 25 and coached future MLB pitcher Addison Reed at San Diego State. Thanks to a pitching staff that dominated many statistical categories in the Mountain West Conference, the 2013 San Diego State team won the 2013 Mountain West Conference baseball tournament for its first conference title since 2000 and first NCAA tournament appearance since 2009.

=== Saint Mary's (2014–2019) ===
On July 31, 2013, he was hired as head coach at Saint Mary's. After going 16–39 in 2014, Saint Mary's improved to 28–27 in 2015. In 2016, Valenzuela led Saint Mary's to a 33–25 record with the first WCC tournament title and NCAA tournament appearance in program history, for which he earned WCC Coach of the Year honors.

=== Long Beach State ===
On June 9, 2019, Valenzuela was named the head coach of the Long Beach State Dirtbags baseball program.

== Head coaching record ==
Below is a table of Valenzuela's yearly records as an NCAA head baseball coach.

Record table
Season	Team	Overall	Conference	Standing	Postseason
Saint Mary's Gaels (West Coast Conference) (2014–2019)
2014	Saint Mary's	16–39	8–19	9th	
2015	Saint Mary's	28–27	10–17	T–8th	
2016	Saint Mary's	33–25	18–9	T–1st	NCAA Regional
2017	Saint Mary's	37–20	18–9	T–4th	
2018	Saint Mary's	31–23	14–13	5th	
2019	Saint Mary's	35–22	17–10	3rd	
Long Beach State Dirtbags (Big West Conference) (2020–2023)
2020	Long Beach State	10–5	0–0		Season canceled due to COVID-19
2021	Long Beach State	28–15	26–14	3rd	
2022	Long Beach State	29–27	17–13	T-4th	
2023	Long Beach State	33–22	17–13	7th	
Long Beach State:		100–69 (.592)	60–40 (.600)		
Saint Mary's Gaels (West Coast Conference) (2024–present)
2024	Saint Mary's	34–22	16–8	3rd	WCC tournament
2025	Saint Mary's	36–26	15–9	3rd	NCAA Regional
2026	Saint Mary's	37–28	15–12	T–3rd	NCAA Regional
Saint Mary's:		287–232 (.553)	131–105 (.555)		
Total:		387–301 (.563)			
National champion Postseason invitational champion Conference regular season champion Conference regular season and conference tournament champion Division regular season champion Division regular season and conference tournament champion Conference tournament champion

== See also ==
- List of current NCAA Division I baseball coaches
