= Louis Guisto Field (1928) =

Baseball venue in Moraga, California

- Interactive map of Louis Guisto Field
- Former names: Brother Agon Field
- Location: De La Salle Drive, Moraga, CA, United States
- Coordinates: 37.840879°N 122.112364°W
- Owner: Saint Mary's College of California
- Operator: Saint Mary's College of California
- Capacity: 1,000
- Surface: Natural grass
- Scoreboard: Electronic
- Field size: 340 feet (Left field); 375 feet (LCF); 400 feet (Center field); 375 feet (RCF); 340 feet (Right field)

Construction
- Opened: 1928
- Renovated: 2009
- Closed: 2011

Tenant
- Saint Mary's Gaels baseball (1928–2011)

Louis Guisto Field is a baseball venue in Moraga, California, United States. It was home to the Saint Mary's Gaels college baseball team of the NCAA Division I West Coast Conference from 1928 to 2011. Named for former Gaels baseball player and coach Louis Guisto, the field has a capacity of 1,000 spectators. Before being named for Guisto, the field was known as Brother Agon Field.

== History ==
Saint Mary's has played at Guisto Field since 1928. In 2009, the field was given a new infield and other minor improvements.

In the mid-2000s, proposals for a new facility surfaced. In 2011, construction began on a new on-campus Gaels baseball venue. The field's construction is part of the Athletics & Recreation Corridor construction project. The field was replaced in 2012 by the new Louis Guisto Field. The new facility stands beyond the right field fence of the old venue, which is slated to be demolished.
