= Wyatt Mills =

American baseball player (born 1995)

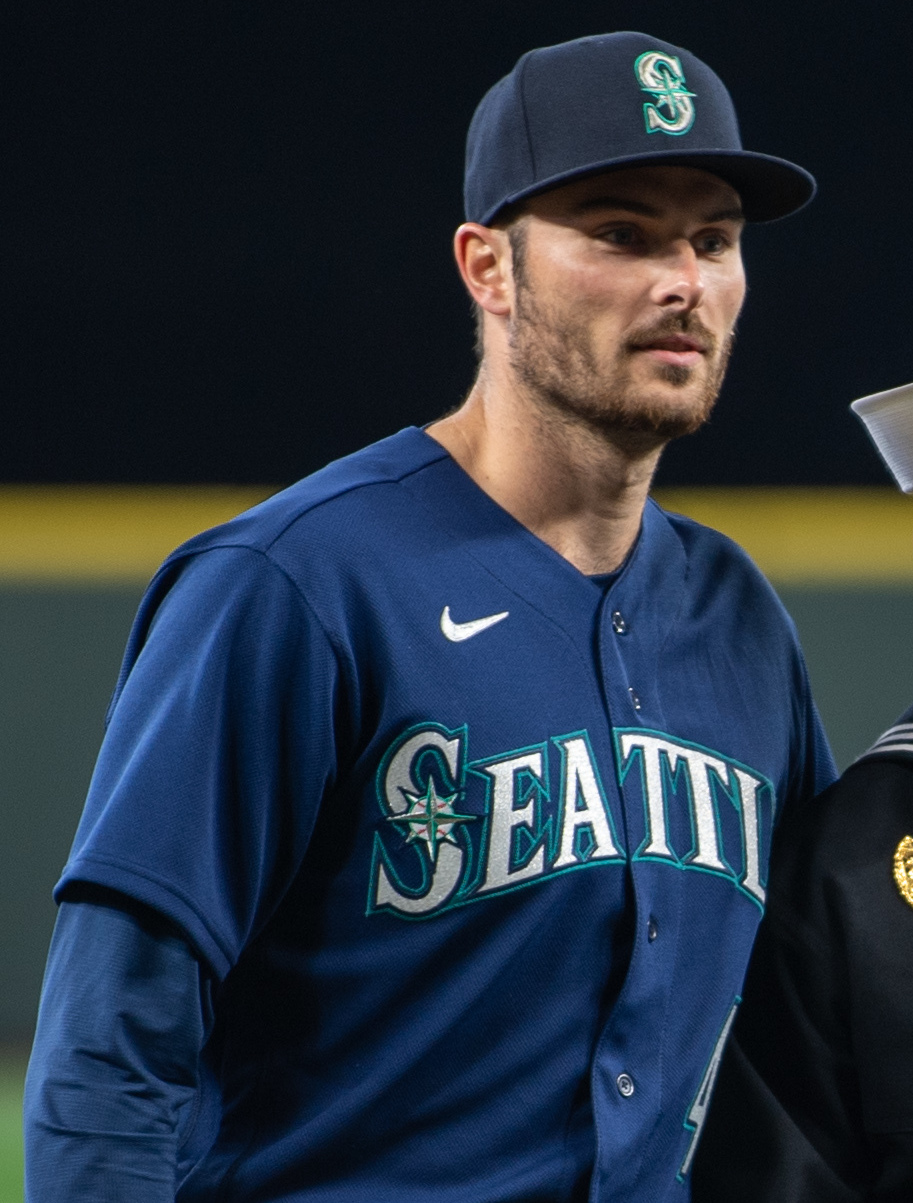
- Mills with the Seattle Mariners in 2022

Free agent
- Pitcher
- Born: January 25, 1995 (age 31); Spokane, Washington, U.S.
- Bats: Right Throws: Right

MLB debut
- May 1, 2021, for the Seattle Mariners

MLB statistics (through 2026 season)
- Win–loss record: 0–1
- Earned run average: 6.14
- Strikeouts: 42
- Stats at Baseball Reference

Teams
- Seattle Mariners (2021–2022); Kansas City Royals (2022); Los Angeles Dodgers (2026)

Gregory Wyatt Mills (born January 25, 1995) is an American professional baseball pitcher who is a free agent. He has previously played in Major League Baseball (MLB) for the Seattle Mariners, Kansas City Royals, and Los Angeles Dodgers. He made his MLB debut in 2021.

== Amateur career ==
Mills attended Gonzaga Preparatory School in Spokane, Washington. Undrafted out of high school, he enrolled at Gonzaga University where he played college baseball for the Bulldogs.

In 2014, as a freshman at Gonzaga, Mills compiled a 3.65 earned run average (ERA) in 12 1/3 innings pitched, and as a sophomore in 2015, he went 1–0 with a 2.79 ERA in 19 innings. Mills broke out as a junior in 2016, going 3–2 with a 2.65 ERA and seven saves in 37 innings pitched in relief. He was selected by the Tampa Bay Rays in the 17th round of the 2016 MLB draft, but did not sign. That summer, he played in the Alaska Baseball League. During his senior year, he went 2–2 with a 1.79 ERA and 12 saves in 22 relief appearances. He was then selected by the Seattle Mariners in the third round of the 2017 MLB draft.

== Professional career ==
=== Seattle Mariners ===
Mills signed with Seattle and made his professional debut with the Everett AquaSox before earning a promotion to the Clinton LumberKings. In 20 1/3 innings pitched between the two club, he went 0–2 with six saves and a 1.77 ERA, striking out 29. In 2018, he began the year with the Modesto Nuts, with whom he went 6–0 with 11 saves and a 1.91 ERA in 42 1/3 innings pitched and was named a California League All-Star. At the end of the season, he was promoted to the Arkansas Travelers, pitching to a 10.13 ERA in 10 2/3 innings. After the season, he was assigned to play for the Peoria Javelinas of the Arizona Fall League where he was 1–0 with a 1.93 ERA in eight appearances. In 2019, he returned to Arkansas, going 4–2 with eight saves and a 4.27 ERA over 52 2/3 relief innings, striking out 66. He did not pitch professionally during 2020, due to cancellation of the minor-league season amidst the COVID-19 pandemic.

On November 20, 2020, Mills was added to Seattle's 40-man roster. On May 1, 2021, Mills was promoted to the major leagues for the first time. He made his MLB debut that night, pitching a scoreless inning of relief against the Los Angeles Angels. For the 2021 season with the Mariners, Mills pitched 12 2/3 innings in which he gave up 14 earned runs, walking seven, and striking out 11. When not with Seattle, Mills pitched with the Tacoma Rainiers of the Triple-A West, going 4–2 with a 3.14 ERA and 51 strikeouts over 28 2/3 innings.

During 2022, Mills split time between Seattle and Tacoma through June; he appeared in eight games with Seattle during which he recorded a 4.15 ERA while striking out six batters in 8 2/3 innings, and 16 games with Tacoma with a 1.87 ERA while striking out 17 batters in 19 2/3 innings.

=== Kansas City Royals ===
On June 27, 2022, Mills and minor-league starting pitcher William Fleming were traded to the Kansas City Royals in exchange for Carlos Santana. Through the end of the regular season, Mills pitched in 19 games for Kansas City, striking out 20 batters in 20 2/3 innings with a 4.79 ERA. He also pitched in 13 minor-league games with the Omaha Storm Chasers, posted a 2.57 ERA while striking out 23 batters in 14 innings. On December 13, Mills was designated for assignment.

=== Boston Red Sox ===
On December 16, 2022, Mills was traded to the Boston Red Sox for minor-league pitcher Jacob Wallace. Mills began the 2023 season on the injured list due to right elbow inflammation. He suffered additional elbow inflammation in mid-March, delaying his recovery, and was transferred to the 60-day injured list on April 16. On July 5, Mills underwent Tommy John surgery, ending his season. Following the season on November 17, the Red Sox declined to tender Mills an offer, making him a free agent.

On November 19, 2023, Mills re-signed with the Red Sox on a two-year minor league contract. He returned to action in 2025 with the Triple-A Worcester Red Sox, making 32 appearances (seven starts) in which he posted a 4-2 record and 3.12 ERA with 49 strikeouts and one save across 52 innings of work. Mills was released by the Red Sox organization on August 3, 2025.

=== Los Angeles Dodgers ===
On August 16, 2025, Mills signed a minor league contract with the Los Angeles Dodgers organization. To begin the 2026 season, he was assigned to the Triple-A Oklahoma City Comets, posting a 3.26 ERA with 28 strikeouts in 14 appearances. On May 10, 2026, the Dodgers selected Mills' contract, adding him to their active roster. He was optioned back to Triple-A on May 19. In six total appearances for Los Angeles, Mills recorded a 5.68 ERA with five strikeouts across 6 1/3 innings pitched. Mills was designated for assignment by the Dodgers on August 3.

=== Washington Nationals ===
On August 6, 2026, Mills was claimed off waivers by the Washington Nationals, and optioned him to the Triple-A Rochester Red Wings. He never made an appearance due to an undisclosed injury. On September 17, Mills was released by the Nationals.

== International career ==
In October 2019, Mills was selected for the United States national baseball team for the 2019 WBSC Premier12 tournament, held in November. He was 1–0 with a 4.91 ERA in five relief appearances.
