= Louis Guisto Field =

Baseball venue in California, USA

- Interactive map of Louis Guisto Field
- Location: De La Salle Drive and Saint Mary's Parkway, Moraga, CA, USA
- Coordinates: 37.841512°N 122.111953°W
- Owner: Saint Mary's College of California
- Operator: Saint Mary's College of California
- Capacity: 1,100
- Surface: Natural grass
- Scoreboard: Electronic
- Field size: 330 feet (Left field); 375 feet (LCF); 400 feet (Center field); 375 feet (RCF); 330 feet (Right field)

Construction
- Built: 2011–12
- Opened: February 17, 2012

Tenant
- Saint Mary's Gaels baseball (2012–present)

Louis Guisto Field is a baseball venue in Moraga, California, USA. It is home to the Saint Mary's Gaels baseball team of the NCAA Division I West Coast Conference. Opened in 2012, the venue replaced the old Louis Guisto Field (the location of which was behind the third base line of the new facility) as the home of Saint Mary's baseball. Like the old facility, it is named for former Saint Mary's baseball player and coach Louis Guisto. The field opened on February 17, 2012, when Saint Mary's defeated Southern Utah 2–1 in front of 1,100 fans. Former Major League pitcher Tom Candiotti (Saint Mary's Class of 1979) threw out the honorary first pitch.

Following the 2012 season, construction on the facility will enter its second phase. During this period, a grandstand with a capacity of 1,500 spectators will be added. The old facility will be razed, and a building housing a swimming pool, team offices, and training rooms will be built in its place.

== See also ==
- List of NCAA Division I baseball venues
