= Keith Ramsey =

- Pitcher
- Born: March 5, 1980 (age 45); Inglewood, California
- Bats: Switch Throws: Left

Keith Benjamin Ramsey (born March 5, 1980 Inglewood, California) is an American former professional baseball pitcher who played from 2002 to 2012.

== Family ==
Keith Ramsey is the son of Chris and Florann Ramsey. Chris is an attorney and lifelong surfer. Keith has a sister named Allie and a brother named Timmy. Keith's uncle, John Ramsey, was the public address announcer of the Los Angeles Dodgers starting in 1958 until his retirement in 1982. He died in 1990. Besides baseball, Keith's Uncle John also announced Lakers basketball, Rams and Raiders football, Kings hockey and USC football.

== High school career ==
Ramsey attended Loyola High School of Los Angeles. While there, he earned All-League and All-Conference honors.

In 1998, as a senior, Ramsey had a .510 batting average with 10 doubles, 21 RBI and 13 runs scored. On the mound, he was 2−1 with a save and a 3.45 ERA. He earned MVP honors at the SoCal Challenge.

Ramsey was also the goalie on the school's soccer team which won the state championship. He was selected as the CIF Goalie of the year and established school records in shutouts and goals against average.

One of Ramsey's friends during his high school career, Kriston Palomo, was killed during a game by a runner's batting helmet which hit him in the larynx. From that day on, Ramsey has tried to wear Palomo's #29 whenever possible in his collegiate and professional careers and, after each victory, Keith points to the sky to honor his friend.

== College career ==
Ramsey began his collegiate career with LA Harbor Junior College in 1999 and 2000. He was a two-time All-Conference player.

While a freshman, Ramsey pitched in one game. He had a 1−1 record with a 1.10 ERA. As an outfielder, he hit .420 with 7 doubles, 20 RBI and 18 runs scored.

During his sophomore year, Ramsey was 1–1 with one save and a 1.31 ERA. He struck out 28 in 31 and a third innings. At the plate, he hit .361 with six doubles and 22 RBI.

As a junior in 2001, Ramsey switched to the University of Florida where he put up a 4–3 record with 9 saves and a 2.24 ERA as a reliever. At one point in the season, he had nine consecutive appearances without giving up a run. He struck out 56 batters in 52 and a third innings. In the SEC Tournament and the NCAA postseason, Ramsey made four appearances and posted a perfect 0.00 ERA while collecting a save. He struck out 12 in just 6 and two thirds innings pitched. He was awarded the team's Best Pitcher Award for the season.

At the end of the 2001 season, Ramsey was selected by the Cincinnati Reds in 11th round (336th overall) of the 2001 Major League Baseball draft, but he decided to play his senior season for Florida. Ramsey made the switch to being a starter for the 2002 season. He would end up starting 17 of the 19 games he appeared in and also collecting two complete game shutouts. His record for the year was 10−3 with a 3.88 ERA.

Throughout Ramsey's collegiate career, he participated in various amateur leagues including the Saskatchewan Major Baseball League where he hit .331 with 19 RBI, 21 stolen bases, and 10 doubles while having a perfect 0.00 ERA and 6 saves for the Melville Millionaires. He also played with the Compton Rottweilers.

== Minor league career ==
Keith was selected in the 10th round of the 2002 Major League Baseball draft (304th overall) by the Cleveland Indians, and he signed with them.

Ramsey began his minor league career in 2002 with the Mahoning Valley Scrappers of the New York–Penn League. In his collegiate career, he was used mostly as a reliever until his senior year. From the very start of his professional days, Ramsey was a starter. He would start 10 of the 13 games he appeared in 2002. Ramsey finished the campaign with a 6–3 record with a 2.03 ERA and 71 strikeouts in 62 innings pitched. Keith led the Scrappers in ERA, WHIP (0.85), and strikeouts. He was 5th in the NYPL in ERA and selected as a post-season All-Star.

Keith spent most of 2003 with the Lake County Captains in the South Atlantic League. For the season, he posted a 13–6 record and a 2.99 ERA. He threw 3 complete games including a shutout. Keith led the Captains in strikeouts with 108. Ramsey also started two games for the Akron Aeros in the Eastern League going 1–0 with a 6.55 ERA. He was 0.01 shy of 10th place in the SAL in ERA.

Ramsey moved on to the Kinston Indians in the Carolina League for 2004. While in Kinston, Ramsey had a big hand in helping the K-Tribe capture the league championship with a 10–4 record, 2 complete games, and a 3.85 ERA despite also leading the league with 19 home runs allowed. On September 6, Ramsey threw a 6–0 perfect game against the Myrtle Beach Pelicans in the last game of the season with his sister Allie in the stands at Coastal Federal Field. It was just the fourth nine-inning perfect game in Carolina League history and the first since a 1978 gem by Marty Bystrom for the Peninsula Pilots. Keith threw just 97 pitches in the contest, two changeups, two splitters, 35 curveballs, and 58 fastballs in the 82–84 mph range. He recorded five strikeouts, seven groundouts, and fifteen flyouts. The closest that the Pelicans came to a hit was a line drive to right center that Jonathan Van Every made a "highlight-reel catch" of for the second out in the ninth inning. Keith reached a full count just twice. The game itself almost did not happen due to a steady mist that delayed the start nearly a half-hour. The weather along with the fact that it was technically a meaningless game since the playoff spots had already been decided, led to some pregame discussion of a cancellation. Ramsey has called the game "a gift from God ... my shining moment." It also uplifted his team. The K-Tribe had lost seven of ten games going into the game. The excitement of the perfect game was credited with picking up the team's spirits and giving them the momentum they needed going into the playoffs. Teammate Dennis Malave was quoted as saying that the game "set us free from negative thinking."

During the season, Ramsey also got two starts for the Buffalo Bisons in the International League where his record was 1–1 with a 3.60 ERA. As yet, these two triple-A starts are the closest Ramsey has been to the major leagues.

Following the 2004 season, Keith pitched for the Peoria Javelinas in the Arizona Fall League. Ramsey was in Peoria to work on his changeup and tweak his mechanics in an effort to make him throw harder. Reflecting on this stint years later, Keith has stated that he had "tried to become something he wasn't ... and that's kind of where things went downhill." He was used entirely in relief and in 11 appearances pitched just 10 innings. Keith was not involved in any decisions and he posted a 10.80 ERA. On December 13, Keith was selected by Colorado Rockies in the Rule 5 draft.

In 2005, Ramsey would see action for three different teams in three different farm systems. He began the year with the Tulsa Drillers in the Texas League for the Rockies. While in Tulsa, Keith went 1–3 in 10 games with a 7.68 ERA. He also batted in a game going 1 for 3 with a sacrifice for a .333 batting average. His subpar performance on the mound led to his release by the Rockies. He was then picked up by the Arizona Diamondbacks who assigned him to the Lancaster JetHawks in the California League. In Lancaster, Keith pitched just 4 relief innings and posted a 0–1 record and an ERA of 4.50. The D-Backs then traded him to the Philadelphia Phillies for "future considerations". The Phillies assigned Ramsey to their Florida State League affiliate, the Clearwater Phillies. For the Phils, Keith went 2-4 with a 5.07 ERA.

Late in the 2006 spring training, Ramsey was released by the Phillies. By April 1, he had signed to play with the Somerset Patriots in the independent Atlantic League. The Patriots were being managed by Sparky Lyle. For Somerset, Ramsey put up a 6–7 record with a 3.76 ERA. His 155 and two-thirds innings were the most he pitched since the 2003 season. He was rewarded with a trip to the league All-Star game.

The Texas Rangers decided to take a chance on him for the 2007 season and signed him to a minor league contract. Ramsey was assigned to the Bakersfield Blaze of the California League. Keith was soon released after an 0–2 start. He only made it through six and a third innings for the Blaze and posted a dismal 15.63 ERA. Following his release, Ramsey returned to Somerset where he had a 6−9 record with a 4.64 ERA, 2 complete games, and a shutout. Ramsey also saw a little time in the outfield for the first time since his college days. At the plate, he had one official at bat and a .000 batting average, but he did score a run.

April 2008 saw Ramsey pitching in the Chinese Professional Baseball League of Taiwan for the Brother Elephants. His career in Taiwan lasted just three innings on April 25 as he was rocked for six runs on seven hits, including two home runs in a 12–4 loss against the President Lions. Returning to the United States, Ramsey found work back in the Atlantic League with the Southern Maryland Blue Crabs who are owned by Hall of Fame member Brooks Robinson. He was signed on June 4 with the season already in progress. By the end of the season, Keith compiled a record of 7–6 with 1 complete game and a 4.01 ERA. He started 20 of the 21 games he appeared in.

== Musical career and off season activities ==
Ramsey is a guitarist who plays right-handed despite being a southpaw. He has played the National Anthem "Hendrix-style" prior to games for Kinston and Somerset. Keith is the rhythm guitarist and lead singer in a "surf rock" band called Flava Do. On August 20, 2006, Ramsey pitched six innings in a Patriots victory and then, after the game, put on a concert for the fans with his brother Timmy who also plays in Flava Do. Teammate Dave Elder joined the brothers on a Pearl Jam song

== Sources and further reading ==
- Anon.: "K-Tribe's Ramsey Ends Season With Perfect Game", in The Goldsboro News-Argus (Goldsboro, North Carolina), September 7, 2004
- Anon.: "Ramsey Saddles Up With Rangers", on Our Sports Central, March 12, 2007
- Anon.: "Somerset Patriots Re-Sign Pitcher Keith Ramsey", on NJ.com (blog site), May 29, 2007. article re-posted to blog site
- Ashmore, Mike: "The Keith Ramsey Experience", in The Hunterdon County Democrat, July 27, 2006. On Mike Ashmore's site
- Hall, David: "Former K-Tribe Pitcher Enjoys Life On The Beach", in The Kinston Free Press, January 19, 2007
- Hall, David: "Perfect Game Perfect Timing", in The Kinston Free Press, September 8, 2004
- Hall, David: "Ramsey Is Still A Pitcher Of Contentment", in The Kinston Free Press, May 11, 2007
- Huang, Paul: "President Lions Destroy Brother Elephants 12−4", in The Taipei Times, April 27, 2008.
- Sinclair, Rob: "Ramsey's Perfect Game First In Team History", in The Kinston Indians 2005 Yearbook, p. 39. His one game in Taiwan.
- Stanchak, Scott and Mike Ashmore: "Rock On, Ramsey", on Atlantic League Baseball News, August 20, 2006. Atlantic League blog
- Waldrop, Melinda: "PERFECTION", in The Sun News (Myrtle Beach, South Carolina), September 7, 2004. reprinted at the Kinston Free Press website
- Winston, Lisa: "Surfer/Musician Hits Perfect Tune On Mound", in USA Today, September 24, 2004
