= Dante Benedetti Diamond at Max Ulrich Field =

Sports venue in San Francisco, California

- Benedetti Diamond
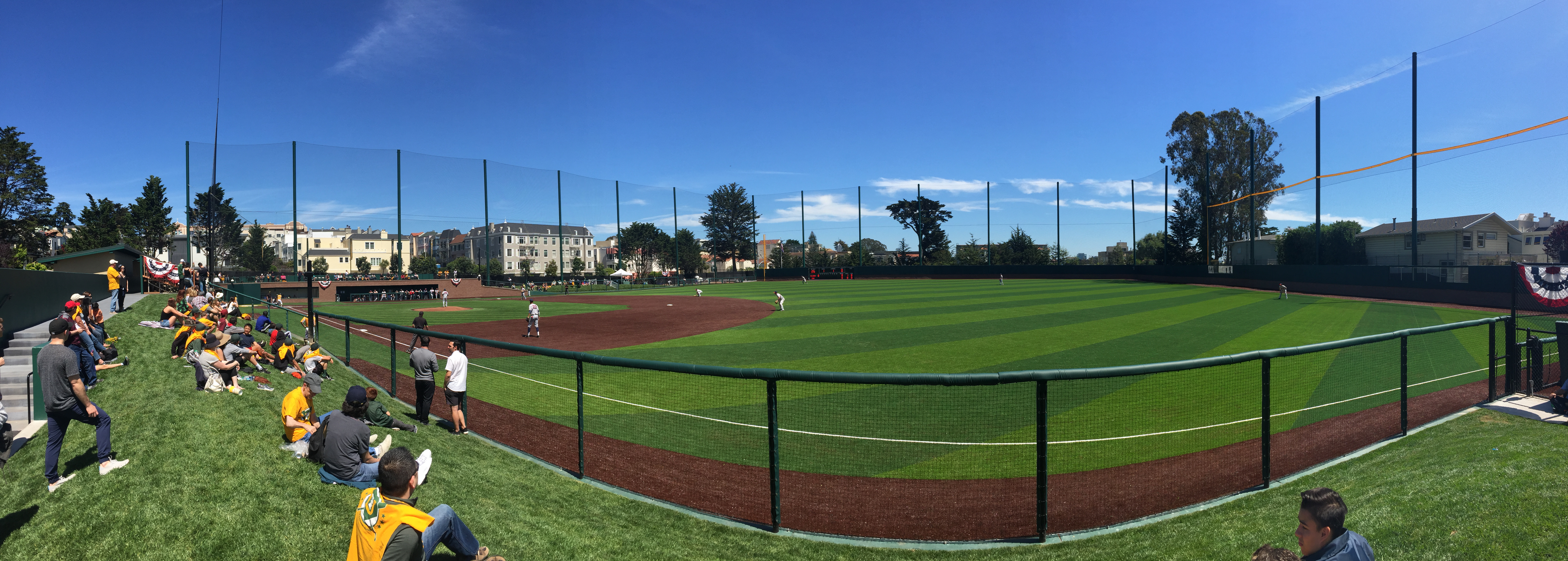
- First-base side at Dante Benedetti Diamond at Max Ulrich Field
- Interactive map of Dante Benedetti Diamond at Max Ulrich Field
- Former names: Max Ulrich Field (1953-1980)
- Location: Golden Gate Avenue and Masonic Avenue, San Francisco, CA, USA
- Coordinates: 37.776684°N 122.448017°W
- Owner: University of San Francisco
- Operator: University of San Francisco
- Capacity: 2,000
- Surface: Natural grass
- Scoreboard: Electronic
- Field size: 315 feet (Left field); 415 feet (Center field); 321 feet (Right field)

Construction
- Opened: 1953

Tenant
- San Francisco Dons baseball (NCAA D1 WCC) (1953-present)

Dante Benedetti Diamond at Max Ulrich Field is a baseball venue in San Francisco, California, United States. It is home to the San Francisco Dons baseball team of the NCAA Division I West Coast Conference. Built in 1953, the original facility had a capacity of 2,000 spectators.

The venue was originally called simply Max Ulrich Field. After its 1953 construction, it was named after Max Ulrich, a San Francisco resident who donated in his will $358,000 to the university. The field took on its current name in 1980. In that year, Dons baseball coach Dante Benedetti retired after 29 years in charge of the program. The diamond was dedicated to him that same year. Until Nino Giarratano surpassed him in 2012, Benedetti was the program's all-time winningest coach, with 373 wins.

The playing field is surrounded by mesh netting, designed to keep foul balls and home runs from damaging nearby houses or flying out onto busy Golden Gate and Masonic avenues.

Benedetti Diamond underwent a $6 million renovation following the 2015 season, resulting in a brand new ballpark on the same site as the original field. The diamond was rotated 90 degrees with the first base line now running along Golden Gate Avenue and home plate in the northwest corner of the field. The playing surface was lowered 18 inches to accommodate a wrap-around spectator deck with seating above and dugouts underneath. The Astroturf surface includes Greenplay organic infill made from ground coconut husks for performance, low temperatures, and player health and safety.

== See also ==
- List of NCAA Division I baseball venues
