= Brandon Bailey (baseball) =

American baseball player (born 1994)

- Pitcher
- Born: October 19, 1994 (age 32); Westminster, Colorado, U.S.
- Batted: Right Threw: Right

MLB debut
- July 26, 2020, for the Houston Astros

Last MLB appearance
- August 14, 2020, for the Houston Astros

MLB statistics
- Win–loss record: 0–0
- Earned run average: 2.45
- Strikeouts: 4
- Stats at Baseball Reference

Teams
- Houston Astros (2020)

Brandon David Keith Bailey (Chickasaw: Nita’ Iskanno’si; born October 19, 1994) is an American former professional baseball pitcher. He played in Major League Baseball (MLB) for the Houston Astros.

== Amateur career ==
Bailey attended Broomfield High School in Broomfield, Colorado, and he pitched for the school's baseball team. As a junior, he had a 10–0 win–loss record and a 1.02 earned run average and 107 strikeouts. During the summer between his junior and senior years, he tore the ulnar collateral ligament in his pitching elbow. He underwent Tommy John surgery, causing him to miss his senior year.

Bailey enrolled at Gonzaga University and played college baseball for the Gonzaga Bulldogs. At Gonzaga, he minored in Native American studies. In 2015, he played collegiate summer baseball for the Yarmouth–Dennis Red Sox of the Cape Cod Baseball League.

== Professional career ==
=== Oakland Athletics ===
The Oakland Athletics selected Bailey in the sixth round of the 2016 Major League Baseball draft. He signed with Oakland and spent his first professional season with both the AZL Athletics and the Vermont Lake Monsters, posting a combined 3–1 record and 2.93 ERA in 12 games between both teams.

In 2017, Bailey spent time with the Beloit Snappers and the Stockton Ports, pitching to a 3–2 record and 3.26 ERA in 24 total games.

=== Houston Astros ===
After the 2017 season, the Athletics traded Bailey to the Astros for Ramón Laureano. In 2018, Bailey split the season between the Buies Creek Astros and the Corpus Christi Hooks, accumulating a 6–8 record with a 2.80 ERA in 121 innings. Bailey spent the 2019 season with Corpus Christi, going 4–5 with a 3.30 ERA over 92 2/3 innings.

On December 12, 2019, the Baltimore Orioles selected Bailey with the second selection of the 2019 Rule 5 draft. Bailey competed for a spot on Baltimore's Opening Day roster in spring training, but was returned to the Astros' organization on March 6. After Commissioner Rob Manfred suspended spring training and postponed the start of the season due to the COVID-19 pandemic, Bailey stayed in Tucson, Arizona and kept his arm warm by throwing with a local high school student. With expanded rosters due to COVID-19, he was a member of the Astros' Opening Day roster. On July 26, 2020, he made his MLB debut.

=== Cincinnati Reds ===
On November 20, 2020, Bailey was traded to the Cincinnati Reds in exchange for cash considerations. On February 26, 2021, Bailey underwent Tommy John surgery, causing him to miss the 2021 season. On March 29, Bailey was placed on the 60-day injured list. On November 30, Bailey was non-tendered by the Reds, making him a free agent.

On December 1, 2021, Bailey re-signed with the Reds. He did not appear in a game for the organization and elected free agency following the season on November 10, 2022.

=== Chicago White Sox ===
On June 7, 2023, Bailey signed a minor league contract with the Chicago White Sox. Bailey made two appearances for the White Sox organization, appearing in one game apiece for the rookie–level Arizona Complex League White Sox and High–A Winston-Salem Dash. That summer, he reinjured his pitching elbow and called home to tell his parents he would be retiring from baseball. He was released by Chicago on November 1.

== Coaching career ==
Bailey earned a master's degree in sports coaching from the University of Northern Colorado.

=== Baltimore Orioles ===
On February 7, 2024, the Baltimore Orioles hired Bailey to serve as the pitching coach for their rookie–level affiliate, the Florida Complex League Orioles.

=== Los Angeles Dodgers ===
In 2025, Bailey was named as assistant pitching coach for the Rancho Cucamonga Quakes, the Single-A affiliate of the Los Angeles Dodgers. On February 5, 2026, he was promoted to same position with the Great Lakes Loons of the Midwest League.

== Personal life ==
Bailey is of Spanish and one-eighth Chickasaw ancestry and an enrolled member of the Chickasaw Nation. He has tattoos depicting, among other things, a Native American warrior, a bison and a woman hearing a bear headdress. He was given a Chickasaw name at birth.

== See also ==
- Rule 5 draft results
