= Trent Pratt =

Baseball coach

Current position
- Title: Head coach
- Team: BYU
- Conference: Big 12
- Record: 117–123

Biographical details
- Born: August 25, 1979 (age 47); Salt Lake City, Utah, U.S.

Playing career
- 1999–2000: Arizona State
- 2001–2002: Auburn
- 2002: Batavia Muckdogs
- 2003–2004: Clearwater Threshers
- 2005: Reading Phillies
- Position: Catcher

Coaching career (HC unless noted)
- 2007–2012: Dixie State (Asst)
- 2013–2022: BYU (H)
- 2022–present: BYU

Head coaching record
- Overall: 117–123
- Tournaments: NCAA: 0–0

Trent John Pratt (born August 25, 1979) is a baseball coach and former catcher who is the current head baseball coach of the BYU Cougars. He played college baseball at Arizona State from 1999 to 2000 before transferring to Auburn where he played in 2001 and 2002 before playing professionally from 2002 to 2005..

== Playing career ==
Pratt went to Tooele High School in Tooele, Utah, where he played catcher. Pratt was selected in the 38th round of the 1998 Major League Baseball draft by the Texas Rangers. He declined to sign with the Rangers, and attended Arizona State University. As a Freshman, Pratt hit .307 with 2 home runs and 24 RBI. As a sophomore, he batted .302 with 1 home run and 14 RBI. The following year, Pratt transferred to Auburn, where he batted .308 with 7 home runs and 41 RBI, following the season he was drafted in the 34th round of the 2001 Major League Baseball draft by the Arizona Diamondbacks, but chose to return to Auburn for his senior year. He hit .308 with 8 home runs and 54 RBI. For his efforts, he was named second team All-Southeastern Conference.

He was drafted for the third time during the 2002 Major League Baseball draft by the Philadelphia Phillies. Pratt began his professional career in 2002 with the Short-Season Batavia Muckdogs of the New York–Penn League, he batted .237 with seven doubles, 28 hits and 12 RBIs in 39 games. In 2003 Pratt spent the entire season with Clearwater Phillies of the Florida State League. He hit .217 with 13 doubles, one triple, 55 hits, 1 steal and 25 RBI in 78 games. Pratt returned to Clearwater in 2004, where he hit .195 with 4 home runs, 7 doubles, one triple, 60 hits and 26 RBI in 93 games. In 2005, Pratt received a promotion to the Double-A Reading Phillies of the Eastern League. He finished the 2005 campaign batting .196 with two home runs, 8 doubles, one triples, 43 hits and 18 RBI in 74 games.

== Coaching career ==
Pratt began his coaching career as an assistant with the Dixie State Trailblazers in 2007. Pratt joined the coaching staff of the BYU Cougars for the 2013 season.

On April 11, 2022, BYU head coach Mike Littlewood resigned his position, with Pratt being named the interim head coach for the remainder of the season. After guiding the Cougars to a 16–9 mark for the remainder of the 2022 season, BYU decided to remove the interim tag and named Pratt the permanent head coach.

== Head coaching record ==
Record table
Season	Team	Overall	Conference	Standing	Postseason
BYU Cougars (West Coast Conference) (2022–2023)
2022	BYU	16–9	9–8	4th	
2023	BYU	24–28	13–14	4th	
BYU Cougars (Big 12 Conference) (2024–present)
2024	BYU	21–31	7–23	13th	
2025	BYU	28–27	10–20	12th	Big 12 tournament
2026	BYU	28-28	14-16	9th	Big 12 tournament
BYU:		117–123	53–81		
Total:		117–123			
National champion Postseason invitational champion Conference regular season champion Conference regular season and conference tournament champion Division regular season champion Division regular season and conference tournament champion Conference tournament champion
