= Steve Quis =

American sportscaster

Steve Quis is an American sportscaster who is based in San Diego, CA and employed by Spectrum SportsNet, ESPN, UC San Diego, San Diego Strike Force, San Diego State, San Diego Clippers and San Diego Miramar College as Public Information Officer.

== Broadcasting career ==
Quis currently calls college basketball nationally for ESPN. In addition, he serves as the Voice of UC San Diego men's basketball on ESPN+ (home games) and 97.3 The Fan (road games). He is also Voice of the San Diego Clippers, G-League affiliate of the Los Angeles Clippers. In addition, he serves as television play-by-play announcer for San Diego State football and men’s and women’s basketball. In May 2025, he began calling the Big West Baseball Championships on ESPN.

Quis has called San Diego Strike Force Indoor Football League games since 2019. The Strike Force were named IFL Broadcast of the Year in 2025.

In August 2024, he began calling Big 12 women’s volleyball along with men’s and women’s basketball for the University of Arizona on ESPN+.

In addition to his basketball work at UC San Diego, he announces men’s and women's soccer, men's and women's volleyball, men’s and women's water polo, softball and baseball for the Tritons Big West ESPN+ package.

For two seasons, Quis called the Ford CIF Southern Section High School Game of the Week on Bally Sports West.

Since 2012, he has been voice of the California State High School Football and Basketball Championships for Spectrum SportsNet in Los Angeles.

For a decade, Quis called West Coast Conference men's basketball and the WCC baseball championships on various regional networks and Stadium.

From 2006 to 2010, Quis served as one of the TV play-by-play announcers for the San Diego Padres on Channel 4 San Diego. He was behind the mic when fellow Arizona alum Trevor Hoffman broke Major League Baseball's saves record.

During the 2012–2013 seasons, Quis called Major League Baseball nationally on radio for Compass Media Networks.

In the past, he has called college wrestling for CBS Sports Network, LA KISS Arena League football on KCAL-9 Los Angeles, Los Angeles D-Fenders NBA D-League basketball, WNBA L.A. Sparks basketball while hosting “WCC This Week” on Spectrum SportsNet in Los Angeles.

Quis was the Padres beat reporter for MLB Network in 2011 and has been the television and radio voice of the San Diego State Aztecs football and basketball teams (2004–2012). He served as television announcer for University of San Diego basketball and football from 2006 to 2012. Quis hosted The Steve Fisher Coaches Show on KOGO radio from 2010 to 2013.

From 2010 to 2021, Quis was the fill-in sports anchor at KFMB-TV San Diego and hosted Chargers Game Day on CBS 8 in 2013. From 2004 to 2010, he was the post game show host for the San Diego Chargers Radio Network.

In 2004, he was the radio play-by-play announcer for the San Diego Riptide of Arena League2.

For Channel 4SD, Steve hosted Chargers Preview with Jim Harbaugh; Aztecs Magazine; The Brady Hoke Coaches Show; the High School Football Game of the Week; he was employed by the station from 2004 through 2012 where he was also co-anchor for its nightly half hour sports program Post Game.

Quis moved to San Diego in 2000 to join KUSI-TV as weekend sports anchor. He also served as the North County correspondent on the Prep Pigskin Report where he covered Alex Smith, Reggie Bush, and current Vikings Head Coach Kevin O'Connell.

Quis has also worked at KOLD-TV in Tucson as a sports anchor/reporter, and KUSI-TV in the same role. He was the radio play-by-play voice, along with Mario Impemba, for Pacific Coast League Tucson Toros baseball from 1993 to 1999. He was the radio voice of University of Arizona baseball from 1991 to 1992. Quis is a three-time Emmy award winner.

When not hustling to his next broadcast, Quis has been the full time Public Information Officer at San Diego Miramar College since 2015. Prior to the appointment, he was Director of Public Relations for Brandman University (2014) and Academic Communications Manager for Bridgepoint Education (2010-2013)

== Awards ==
- Emmy Award for best sports feature - Adaptive Golf
- Emmy Award winner for providing play-by-play coverage of Trevor Hoffman's record breaking save in MLB
- Bridgepoint Education Hero of the Year
- Associated Press Arizona Press Award
- 2025 Indoor Football League Broadcast of the Year

== Personal life ==
Quis grew up in Fullerton and is a resident of San Diego. He is a graduate of Fullerton Union High School and the University of Arizona. Steve is married to Jennifer Quis. Their son is a Naval Aviator and a graduate of the University of Arizona, while their daughter is an aerospace engineer, and a graduate of San Diego State University.
