= 2015 BYU Cougars baseball team =

American college baseball season

2015 BYU Cougars baseball
- Conference: West Coast Conference
- Record: 28–25 (16–11 WCC)
- Head coach: Mike Littlewood (3rd season)
- Assistant coaches: Trent Pratt (3rd season); Brent Haring (3rd season); Jeremy Thomas (3rd season)
- Home stadium: Larry H. Miller Field

2015 West Coast Conference baseball standings
	Conf.						Overall
Team	W		L		T	PCT	W		L		T	PCT
San Diego ‍†‍‍	19	–	8	–	0	.704	33	–	22	–	0	.600
Pepperdine ‍‍‡‍^{y}	17	–	10	–	0	.630	30	–	27	–	0	.526
BYU ‍‍‍	16	–	11	–	0	.593	28	–	25	–	0	.528
Loyola Marymount ‍‍‍	16	–	11	–	0	.593	33	–	21	–	1	.609
San Francisco ‍‍‍	15	–	12	–	0	.556	23	–	31	–	0	.426
Gonzaga ‍‍‍	13	–	14	–	0	.481	24	–	28	–	0	.462
Santa Clara ‍‍‍	12	–	15	–	0	.444	26	–	28	–	0	.481
Saint Mary's ‍‍‍	10	–	17	–	0	.370	28	–	27	–	0	.509
Pacific ‍‍‍	10	–	17	–	0	.370	14	–	37	–	0	.275
Portland ‍‍‍	7	–	20	–	0	.259	12	–	42	–	0	.222
† – Conference champion ‡ – Tournament champion y – Invited to the NCAA Division I Baseball Championship; As of May 24, 2015; Rankings from Collegiate Baseball

The 2015 BYU Cougars baseball team represented Brigham Young University in the 2015 NCAA Division I baseball season. Mike Littlewood acted in his 3rd season as head coach of the Cougars. For the second consecutive year BYU was picked to finish sixth in the WCC Pre-season rankings. After using three stadiums last season, the Cougars played all of their home games at Larry H. Miller Field. The Cougars surpassed expectations in the 2015 season. BYU won 7 of their 9 conference series (losing series only at San Diego and at Pacific), claimed the 3-seed in the WCC Tournament, and lost 0 home series for the season. The Cougars went 0–2 in the WCC Tournament, losing both games in the ninth inning, to finish the season 28–25, 16–11 in conference play.

== 2015 Roster ==
2015 BYU Cougars Roster
Pitchers: 6 James Lengal – Senior; 9 Mason Marshall – Sophomore; 11 Kolton Mahoney – Junior; 17 Wyatt Padget – Junior; 18 Brady Corless – Junior; 23 Hayden Rogers – Sophomore; 24 James Barker – Freshman; 25 Jeff Barker – Senior; 26 Riley Gates – Freshman; 27 Michael Rucker – Sophomore; 29 Brandon Kinser – Senior; 32 Maverick Buffo – Freshman; 36 Blake Brailsford – Freshman; 37 Keaton Cenatiempo – Sophomore; 41 Austin Kamel – Junior; 42 Seth Huxford – Freshman	Infielders: 5 Hayden Nielsen – Junior; 7 Parker Starr – Senior; 8 Dillon Robinson – Senior; 10 Brian Hsu – Freshman; 12 Tanner Chauncey – Sophomore; 13 Bret Lopez – Senior; 21 Paxton Larson – Freshman; 22 Dallen Reber – Junior; 43 Derrick Whitney – Junior	Catchers: 14 Bronson Larsen – Sophomore; 16 Jarrett Jarvis – Senior; 35 Colton Shaver – Freshman; 39 Grant Hodges – Freshman; Outfielders: 2 Brennon Lund – Sophomore; 3 Andy Isom – Senior; 4 Eric Urry – Junior; 19 Court Iorg – Freshman

== Schedule ==
2015 BYU Cougars Game Log
Regular season
February

Date	Opponent	Rank	Site/stadium	Television	Score	Win	Loss	Save	Attendance	Overall record	WCC record
February 13	at #16 UC Santa Barbara	–	Caesar Uyesaka Stadium	None	1–8	Justin Jacome (1–0)	Kolton Mahoney (0–1)	None	411	0–1	–
February 14	at #16 UC Santa Barbara	–	Caesar Uyesaka Stadium	None	0–6	Dillon Tate (1–0)	Hayden Rogers (0–1)	None	340	0–2	–
February 14	at #16 UC Santa Barbara	–	Caesar Uyesaka Stadium	None	1–3	Shane Bieber (1–0)	Jeff Barker (0–1)	James Carter (1)	380	0–3	–
February 16	at #16 UC Santa Barbara	–	Caesar Uyesaka Stadium	None	4–5	Domenic Mazza (1–0)	Brady Corless (0–1)	James Carter (2)	305	0–4	–
February 19	vs. Nebraska	–	Peoria Sports Complex	None	3–6	Jeff Chesnut (1–0)	Mason Marshall (0–1)	Josh Roeder (2)	930	0–5	–
February 20	vs. Nebraska	–	Peoria Sports Complex	None	8–3	Jeff Barker (1–1)	Chance Sinclair (1–1)	None	1,150	1–5	–
February 20	vs. Nebraska	–	Peoria Sports Complex	None	1–3 (11)	Colton Howell (1–1)	Michael Rucker (0–1)	Josh Roeder (3)	1,150	1–6	–
February 21	vs. Nebraska	–	Peoria Sports Complex	None	1–9	Zack Engelken (1–0)	Brady Corless (0–2)	Jake Meyers (1)	1,914	1–7	–
February 26	vs. Oklahoma	–	Cashman Field	None	6–7	Jacob Evans (1–0)	Keaton Cenatiempo (0–1)	None	100	1–8	–
February 27	vs. Oklahoma	–	Cashman Field	None	4–3	Michael Rucker (1–1)	Keaton Hernandez (0–1)	None	125	2–8	–
February 27	vs. Oklahoma	–	Cashman Field	None	2–3	Jacob Evans (2–0)	Brandon Kinser (0–1)	None	125	2–9	–
February 28	vs. Oklahoma	–	Cashman Field	None	1–7	Adam Choplick (1–1)	Maverik Buffo (0–1)	None	150	2–10	–

March

Date	Opponent	Rank	Site/stadium	Television	Score	Win	Loss	Save	Attendance	Overall record	WCC record
March 5	Hartford	–	Larry H. Miller Field	TheW.tv	6–0	Kolton Mahoney (1–1)	Kyle Gauthier (1–2)	None	803	3–10	–
March 6	Hartford	–	Larry H. Miller Field	TheW.tv	8–6	Riley Gates (1–0)	Justin Robarge (0–1)	Michael Rucker (1)	825	4–10	–
March 6	Hartford	–	Larry H. Miller Field	TheW.tv	20–4	Brandon Kinser (1–1)	Jacob Mellin (0–1)	None	825	5–10	–
March 7	Hartford	–	Larry H. Miller Field	TheW.tv	11–7	Keaton Cenatiempo (1–1)	Sam Mckay (2–1)	None	817	6–10	–
March 10	at Utah Valley	–	Brent Brown Ballpark	YouTube	10–7	Brady Corless (1–2)	Jake Mayer (0–2)	None	2,213	7–10	–
March 12	Pepperdine*	–	Larry H. Miller Field	BYUtv	3–11	Jackson McClelland (3–1)	Kolton Mahoney (1–2)	None	919	7–11	0–1
March 13	Pepperdine*	–	Larry H. Miller Field	BYUtv	5–3	Keaton Cenatiempo (2–1)	A. J. Puckett (2–3)	Michael Rucker (2)	1,357	8–11	1–1
March 14	Pepperdine*	–	Larry H. Miller Field	BYUtv	6–5 (10)	Michael Rucker (2–1)	Max Gamboa (1–1)	None	1,541	9–11	2–1
March 19	at Gonzaga*	–	Patterson Complex	TheW.tv	6–5	Kolton Mahoney (2–2)	Calvin Lebrun (2–3)	None	517	10–11	3–1
March 20	at Gonzaga*	–	Patterson Complex	TheW.tv	6–7	Sean-Luke Brija (1–1)	James Lengal (0–1)	David Bigelow (4)	391	10–12	3–2
March 21	at Gonzaga*	–	Patterson Complex	TheW.tv	13–4	Brandon Kinser (2–1)	Andrew Spoko (2–3)	None	568	11–12	4–2
March 24	at Utah	–	Smith's Ballpark	P12 Mtn	3–9 (6)	Dylan Drachler (2–2)	Brady Corless (1–3)	None	1,367	11–13	–
March 26	at San Diego*	–	Fowler Park	TheW.tv	1–7	David Hill (5–2)	Kolton Mahoney (2–3)	None	857	11–14	4–3
March 27	at San Diego*	–	Fowler Park	TheW.tv	3–19	PJ Conlon (4–1)	Jeff Barker (1–2)	None	881	11–15	4–4
March 28	at San Diego*	–	Fowler Park	TheW.tv	4–13	CJ Burdick (2–1)	Brandon Kinser (2–2)	None	654	11–16	4–5
March 30	at #29 San Diego State	–	Tony Gwynn Stadium	MW Net	4–0	Michael Rucker (3–1)	Brett Seeburger (0–1)	None	329	12–16	–

April

Date	Opponent	Rank	Site/stadium	Television	Score	Win	Loss	Save	Attendance	Overall record	WCC record
April 2	Portland*	–	Larry H. Miller Field	BYUtv	3–2	Kolton Mahoney (3–3)	Brandon Snyder (0–3)	Michael Rucker (3)	725	13–16	5–5
April 3	Portland*	–	Larry H. Miller Field	BYUtv	3–6	Kurt Yinger (1–5)	Jeff Barker (1–3)	Carl Snaring (2)	1,773	13–17	5–6
April 4	Portland*	–	Larry H. Miller Field	TheW.tv	9–3	Michael Rucker (4–1)	Davis Tominaga (1–5)	None	812	14–17	6–6
April 7	Utah Valley	–	Larry H. Miller Field	BYUtv	15–6	Brandon Kinser (3–2)	Patrick Wolfe (1–4)	None	1,344	15–17	–
April 9	at Loyola Marymount*	–	George C. Page Stadium	LMUSN	5–3 (12)	Keaton Cenatiempo (3–1)	J.D. Busfield (2–1)	Michael Rucker (4)	362	16–17	7–6
April 10	at Loyola Marymount*	–	George C. Page Stadium	TheW.tv	4–2	Brandon Kinser (4–2)	Trevor Megill (2–3)	Michael Rucker (5)	478	17–17	8–6
April 11	at Loyola Marymount*	–	George C. Page Stadium	LMUSN	2–8	Sean Watkins (3–0)	Brady Corless (1–4)	None	391	17–18	8–7
April 13	at Cal State Northridge	–	Matador Field	None	8–10	Conner O'Neil (3–2)	Kolton Mahoney (3–4)	None	203	17–19	–
April 21	Utah	–	Larry H. Miller Field	BYUtv	7–6	Brandon Kinser (5–2)	Bret Helton (2–6)	Michael Rucker (6)	1,848	18–19	–
April 23	San Francisco*	–	Larry H. Miller Field	BYUtv	14–4	Kolton Mahoney (4–4)	Anthony Shew (6–4)	None	1,361	19–19	9–7
April 24	San Francisco*	–	Larry H. Miller Field	BYUtv	6–5 (10)	Mason Marshall (1–1)	Travis Ulstead (1–2)	None	1,199	20–19	10–7
April 25	San Francisco*	–	Larry H. Miller Field	TheW.tv	3–2 (10)	Mason Marshall (2–1)	Christian Cecilio (5–2)	None	1,160	21–19	11–7
April 28	at Utah Valley	–	Brent Brown Ballpark	YouTube	5–2	Brady Corless (2–4)	Jake Mayer (1–5)	Keaton Cenatiempo (1)	4,240	22–19	–
April 30	at Pacific*	–	Klein Family Field	TheW.tv	3–4	Jake Jenkins (3–6)	Kolton Mahoney (4–5)	Vince Arobio (7)	456	22–20	11–8

May

Date	Opponent	Rank	Site/stadium	Television	Score	Win	Loss	Save	Attendance	Overall record	WCC record
May 1	at Pacific*	–	Klein Family Field	TheW.tv	6–11	Sean Bennetts (1–6)	Brandon Kinser (5–3)	None	863	22–21	11–9
May 2	at Pacific*	–	Klein Family Field	TheW.tv	6–4 (11)	Mason Marshall (3–1)	Vince Arobio (1–1)	None	445	23–21	12–9
May 7	Saint Mary's*	–	Larry H. Miller Field	BYUtv	5–14	Johnny York (7–4)	Kolton Mahoney (4–6)	None	846	23–22	12–10
May 8	Saint Mary's*	–	Larry H. Miller Field	BYUtv	17–1	Brandon Kinser (6–3)	Corbin Burnes (6–5)	None	1,037	24–22	13–10
May 9	Saint Mary's*	–	Larry H. Miller Field	BYUtv	Cancelled due to weather- Will be made up May 18						
May 12	at Utah	–	Smith's Ballpark	P12	16–6	Keaton Cenatiempo (4–1)	Nolan Stouder (0–5)	None	4,108	25–22	–
May 14	at Santa Clara*	–	Stephen Schott Stadium	Santa Clara Portal	8–5 (10)	Mason Marshall (4–1)	Josh Inouye (2–1)	None	230	26–22	14–10
May 15	at Santa Clara*	–	Stephen Schott Stadium	Santa Clara Portal	7–8	Max Kuhns (1–0)	Kolton Mahoney (4–7)	None	373	26–23	14–11
May 16	at Santa Clara*	–	Stephen Schott Stadium	Santa Clara Portal	4–2	Michael Rucker (5–1)	Steven Wilson (3–4)	Mason Marshall (1)	280	27–23	15–11
May 18	y-Saint Mary's*	–	Louis Guisto Field	TheW.tv	4–3 (10)	James Lengal (1–1)	David Dellaserra (2–4)	None	91	28–23	16–11
May 21	vs. Pepperdine*	–	Banner Island Ballpark	TheW.tv	7–8	Max Gamboa (5–2)	Mason Marshall (4–2)	None	789	28–24	–
May 22	vs. San Diego*	–	Banner Island Ballpark	TheW.tv	4–5	Anthony McIver (3–2)	Kolton Mahoney (4–8)	None	962	28–25	–

Rankings from Collegiate Baseball. Parenthesis indicate tournament seedings.
*West Coast Conference games
y- BYU was considered the home team despite playing in Moraga because the game was originally scheduled to be played in Provo.

== Radio Information ==
Every BYU Baseball game had a radio/internet broadcast available. 33 games were broadcast on KOVO with Brent Norton (play-by-play) calling the games for his 26th consecutive season. A rotating selection of analysts was used. 14 of the games were simulcast on BYU Radio. BYU Radio also had 4 radio exclusives this season: Mar 6 late night & Mar 7 vs. Hartford & Apr 7 & 28 vs. Utah Valley. Robbie Bullough provided play by play for BYU Radio's exclusive games vs. Hartford as well as the Apr. 28 game at Utah Valley. He also sat in on a couple of games Brent Norton was unable to make. The Apr. 7 Utah Valley game was a BYUtv simulcast.

UC Santa Barbara, Nebraska, Oklahoma, Utah Valley, and Cal State Northridge all provided an internet broadcast through their respective athletic websites.

== TV Announcers ==
- March 5: Hartford- Brent Norton & Jeff Bills
- March 6: Hartford, Game 1- Brent Norton & Randy Wilstead
- March 6: Hartford, Game 2- Robbie Bullough & Marc Oslund
- March 7: Hartford- Robbie Bullough & Marc Oslund
- March 10: @ Utah Valley- No announcers
- March 12: Pepperdine- Spencer Linton & Gary Sheide
- March 13: Pepperdine- Spencer Linton & Gary Sheide
- March 14: Pepperdine- Spencer Linton & Gary Sheide
- March 19: @ Gonzaga- No announcers
- March 20: @ Gonzaga- No announcers
- March 21: @ Gonzaga- No announcers
- March 24: @ Utah- JB Long & Kevin Stocker
- March 26: @ San Diego- Jack Murray & John Cunningham
- March 27: @ San Diego- Jack Murray & John Cunningham
- March 28: @ San Diego- Jack Murray & John Cunningham
- March 30: @ San Diego State- Chris Elow
- April 2: Portland- Dave McCann & Gary Sheide
- April 3: Portland- Spencer Linton & Gary Sheide
- April 4: Portland– Brent Norton & Jeff Bills
- April 7: Utah Valley- Spencer Linton & Gary Sheide
- April 9: @ Loyola Marymount- Chris Turkmany & Derek Georgino
- April 10: @ Loyola Marymount- Justin Alderson
- April 11: @ Loyola Marymount- Dalton Green
- April 21: Utah- Dave McCann & Gary Sheide
- April 23: San Francisco- Spencer Linton & Gary Sheide
- April 24: San Francisco- Spencer Linton & Gary Sheide
- April 25: San Francisco- Brent Norton & Randy Wilstead
- April 28: @ Utah Valley- Jordan Bianucci & James Warnick
- April 30: @ Pacific- Paul Muyskens
- May 1: @ Pacific- Justin Alderson
- May 2: @ Pacific- Ricky Garcia
- May 7: Saint Mary's- Spencer Linton & Gary Sheide
- May 8: Saint Mary's- Spencer Linton & Gary Sheide
- May 9: Saint Mary's- Dave McCann & Gary Sheide- Game rained out
- May 12: @ Utah- JB Long & Jerry Kindall
- May 14: @ Santa Clara- David Gentile & Collin Baker
- May 15: @ Santa Clara- No announcers
- May 16: @ Santa Clara- No announcers
- May 18: Saint Mary's in Moraga- Dean Boerner & Daniel Conmy
- May 21: Pepperdine- Justin Alderson & Frank Cruz
- May 22: San Diego- Justin Alderson & Frank Cruz

== See also ==
- 2015 BYU Cougars softball team
- 2015 BYU Cougars men's volleyball team
