= 2022 BYU Cougars softball team =

American college softball season

2022 BYU Cougars softball
- Conference: West Coast Conference
- Record: 42–10 (13–2 WCC)
- Head coach: Gordon Eakin (20th season)
- Assistant coaches: Pete Meredith (9th season); AJ Taulai'i (5th season)
- Home stadium: Gail Miller Field

2022 West Coast Conference softball standings
	Conf.				Overall
Team	W		L	PCT	W		L	PCT
BYU ‍†‍‍	13	–	2	.867	42	–	10	.808
Loyola Marymount ‍†‍‍^{y}	13	–	2	.867	37	–	17	.685
Santa Clara ‍‍‍	7	–	8	.467	21	–	30	.412
San Diego ‍‍‍	5	–	9	.357	20	–	34	.370
Saint Mary's ‍‍‍	4	–	11	.267	16	–	31	.340
Pacific ‍‍‍	2	–	12	.143	12	–	37	.245
† – Conference champion y – Invited to the NCAA tournament As of June 5, 2022; Rankings from NFCA/USA Today

The 2022 BYU Cougars softball team represented Brigham Young University in the 2022 NCAA Division I softball season. Gordon Eakin entered the year as head coach of the Cougars for a 20th consecutive season. 2022 was the ninth season for the Cougars as members of the WCC in softball. Entering the 2022 season, the Cougars had won their last 12 conference championships and were picked as the favorites to win the 2022 WCC title.

== 2022 roster ==
2022 BYU Cougars Roster
Pitchers: 15 Taryn Lennon - Sophomore; 18 Lexi Atcitty - Sophomore; 20 Autumn Moffat-Korth - RS Senior; 23 Violet Zavodnik - Sophomore; 28 Carley Brown - Junior; 33 Lo Salcedo - Sophomore; 38 Chloe Temples - Junior; Catchers: 8 Macy Simmons - Junior; 13 Bridget Fleener - Senior; 24 Natalie Sicairos - Sophomore	Infielders: 3 Marissa Chavez - Senior; 4 Mallory Barber - Senior; 5 Taylei Williams - Senior; 7 Alyssa Podhurcak - Junior; 8 Emma Andrewjeski - Freshman; 12 Lauren Flanders - Freshman; 16 Brooke Hill-Barrington - Senior; 17 Alexis Gilio - Freshman; 54 Huntyr Aca - Junior; 55 Martha Epenesa - Senior	Outfielders: 1 HannahJo Mills - RS Senior; 6 Morgan Sterner - Sophomore; 11 Jaelynn Lambert - Freshman; 12 Lauren Flanders - Freshman; 15 Taryn Lennon - Sophomore; 17 Alexis Gilio - Freshman; 23 Violet Zavodnik - Sophomore

== Schedule ==
2022 BYU Cougars Game Log
UNLV Rebel Classic
February

Date	Opponent	Rank	Site/stadium	Television	Score	Win	Loss	Save	Attendance	Overall record	WCC record
February 10	at UNLV	–	Eller Media Stadium	YouTube	3–5	Jenny Bressler (1–0)	Autumn Moffat-Korth (0–1)	Jasmine Martin (1)	N/A	0–1	–
February 11	vs. Cal State Bakersfield	–	Eller Media Stadium	YouTube	13–4 ^{(5)}	Carley Brown (1–0)	Kirsten Martinez (0–1)	None	N/A	1–1	–
February 11	vs. Hawai'i	–	Eller Media Stadium	YouTube	2–1	Chloe Temples (1–0)	Chloe Borges (0–1)	None	N/A	2–1	–
February 12	vs. Cal State Bakersfield	–	Eller Media Stadium	YouTube	11–2 ^{(5)}	Carley Brown (2–0)	Kaycie Kennedy (0–1)	None	112	3–1	–
February 12	vs. Hawai'i	–	Eller Media Stadium	YouTube	4–1	Autumn Moffat-Korth (1–1)	Brianna Lopez (1–2)	None	251	4–1	–

Stanford Classic
February

Date	Opponent	Rank	Site/stadium	Television	Score	Win	Loss	Save	Attendance	Overall record	WCC record
February 17	at Stanford	–	Boyd & Jill Smith Family Stadium	P12+ STAN	4–3	Autumn Moffat-Korth (2–1)	Alana Vawter (2–2)	None	311	5–1	–
February 17	vs. San Jose State	–	Boyd & Jill Smith Family Stadium	P12+ STAN	8–5	Carley Brown (3–0)	Lacie Ham (1–2)	Autumn Moffat-Korth (1)	152	6–1	–
February 18	vs. UIC	–	Boyd & Jill Smith Family Stadium	P12+ STAN	6–1	Autumn Moffat-Korth (3–1)	Carlee Jo-Clark (1–2)	None	150	7–1	–
February 19	vs. Seattle U	–	Boyd & Jill Smith Family Stadium	P12+ STAN	5–2	Autumn Moffat-Korth (4–1)	Carley Nance (0–1)	None	110	8–1	–

Mary Nutter Collegiate Classic
February

Date	Opponent	Rank	Site/stadium	Television	Score	Win	Loss	Save	Attendance	Overall record	WCC record
February 24	vs. Bethune-Cookman	–	Big League Dreams Complex	FloSoftball	7–0	Chloe Temples (2–0)	Halyne Gonzales (2–1)	None	N/A	9–1	–
February 24	vs. #17 Tennessee	–	Big League Dreams Complex	FloSoftball	3–10	Ashley Rogers (3–0)	Autumn Moffat-Korth (4–2)	None	N/A	9–2	–
February 25	vs. California Baptist	–	Big League Dreams Complex	FloSoftball	3–6	Alyssa Argomaniz (3–2)	Autumn Moffat-Korth (4–3)	Jordan Schuring (1)	N/A	9–3	–
February 26	vs. Long Beach State	–	Big League Dreams Complex	FloSoftball	2–4	Sophia Fernandez (2–2)	Chloe Temples (2–1)	None	655	9–4	–

San Diego Classic
March

Date	Opponent	Rank	Site/stadium	Television	Score	Win	Loss	Save	Attendance	Overall record	WCC record
March 3	at San Diego State	–	SDSU Softball Stadium	SCS Pacific	2–1 ^{(8)}	Chloe Temples (3–1)	Dee Dee Hernandez (2–2)	None	143	10–4	–
March 4	vs. Yale	–	Triton Stadium		8–0^{(5)}	Carley Brown (4–0)	Maddie Latta (0–1)	None	137	11–4	–
March 4	at UC San Diego	–	Triton Stadium	ESPN+	4–1	Chloe Temples (4–1)	Kaia Simpson (3–3)	None	133	12–4	–
March 5	vs. Cal	–	USD Softball Complex		5–0	Autumn Moffat-Korth (5–3)	Sona Halijian (8–1)	None	48	13–4	–

Arizona State/Grand Canyon Invitational
March

Date	Opponent	Rank	Site/stadium	Television	Score	Win	Loss	Save	Attendance	Overall record	WCC record
March 10	at Arizona State	–	Alberta B. Farrington Softball Stadium	P12+ AZ	0–8 ^{(5)}	Mac Morgan (8–1)	Autumn Moffat-Korth (5–4)	None	0	13–5	–
March 11	vs. Rutgers	–	GCU Softball Stadium		11–2 ^{(5)}	Autumn Moffat-Korth (6–4)	Ashley Hitchcock (5–6)	None	100	14–5	–
March 11	at Grand Canyon	–	GCU Softball Stadium	ESPN+	0–2	Ariel Thompson (8–2)	Chloe Temples (4–2)	None	169	14–6	–
March 12	vs. Ball State	–	GCU Softball Stadium		14–5	Carley Brown (5–0)	Emma Eubank (1–2)	None	157	15–6	–
March 12	vs. Kansas City	–	GCU Softball Stadium		Cancelled- KC flight cancelled due to bad weather						

Regular season
March

Date	Opponent	Rank	Site/stadium	Television	Score	Win	Loss	Save	Attendance	Overall record	WCC record
March 15	Maine	–	Gail Miller Field	byutv.org	14–0 ^{(5)}	Carley Brown (6–0)	Gabbie Siciliano (1–4)	None	175	16–6	–
March 17	Idaho State	–	Gail Miller Field	byutv.org	5–2	Autumn Moffat-Korth (7–4)	Emma McMurray (3–4)	Chloe Temples (1)	125	17–6	–
March 19	Southern Utah	–	Gail Miller Field	BYUtv	7–0	Chloe Temples (5–2)	Capri Franzen (1–3)	None	362	18–6	–
March 19	Southern Utah	–	Gail Miller Field	BYUtv	8–0 ^{(6)}	Autumn Moffat-Korth (8–4)	Keimon Winston (1–14)	None	362	19–6	–
March 21	#12 Oregon	–	Gail Miller Field	byutv.org	3–9	Raegan Breedlove (2–0)	Autumn Moffat-Korth (8–5)	None	150	19–7	–
March 25	Iowa State	–	Gail Miller Field	byutv.org	11–3 ^{(5)}	Carley Brown (7–0)	Ellie Spelhaug (5–7)	None	312	20–7	–
March 25	Iowa State	–	Gail Miller Field	byutv.org	5–0	Chloe Temples (6–2)	Saya Swain (6–2)	None	312	21–7	–
March 26	Iowa State	–	Gail Miller Field	byutv.org	11–7	Chloe Temples (7–2)	Ellie Spelhaug (5–8)	None	298	22–7	–
March 31	New Mexico	–	Gail Miller Field	byutv.org	3–8	Amber Linton (10–6)	Autumn Moffat-Korth (8–6)	None	106	22–8	–
March 31	New Mexico	–	Gail Miller Field	byutv.org	12–1 ^{(5)}	Chloe Temples (8–2)	Emma Guindon (9–4)	None	106	23–8	–

April

Date	Opponent	Rank	Site/stadium	Television	Score	Win	Loss	Save	Attendance	Overall record	WCC record
April 1	New Mexico	–	Gail Miller Field	byutv.org	17–1 ^{(5)}	Autumn Moffat-Korth (9–6)	Amber Linton (10–7)	None	386	24–8	–
April 5	at Utah	–	Dumke Family Softball Field	P12+ UTAH	PPD until May 3						
April 8	Loyola Marymount*	–	Gail Miller Field	BYUtv	4–0	Autumn Moffat-Korth (10–6)	Jenna Perez (10–6)	None	346	25–8	1–0
April 8	Loyola Marymount*	–	Gail Miller Field	BYUtv	4–8	Jessica Hubbard (5–0)	Chloe Temples (8–3)	None	346	25–9	1–1
April 9	Loyola Marymount*	–	Gail Miller Field	BYUtv	0–1	Jenna Perez (11–6)	Autumn Moffat-Korth (10–7)	None	325	25–10	1–2
April 12	Dixie State	–	Gail Miller Field	byutv.org	Canceled due to snow						
April 14	at Idaho State	–	Miller Ranch Stadium	ESPN+	Canceled due to rain and freezing temperatures						
April 20	Utah Valley	–	Gail Miller Field	byutv.org	2–0	Chloe Temples (9–3)	Brooke Carter (8–7)	None	533	26–10	–
April 22	at San Diego*	–	USD Softball Complex	YouTube	5–0	Autumn Moffat-Korth (11–7)	Courtney Rose (6–11)	None	186	27–10	2–2
April 23	at San Diego*	–	USD Softball Complex	YouTube	7–4	Chloe Temples (10–3)	McKenna Braegelmann (3–2)	None	193	28–10	3–2
April 23	at San Diego*	–	USD Softball Complex	YouTube	11–0 ^{(6)}	Autumn Moffat-Korth (12–7)	Ashley Daugherty (1–9)	None	194	29–10	4–2
April 26	at Dixie State	–	Karl Brooks Field	ESPN+	8–6	Chloe Temples (11–3)	Carissa Burgess (2–5)	Chloe Temples (1)	243	30–10	–
April 27	at Southern Utah	–	Kathryn Berg Field	ESPN+	12–0 ^{(5)}	Carley Brown (8–0)	Payton Goodrich (0–8)	Lo Salcedo (1)	123	31–10	–
April 29	Santa Clara*	–	Gail Miller Field	byutv.org	20–1 ^{(5)}	Autumn Moffat-Korth (13–7)	Regan Dias (4–10)	None	364	32–10	5–2
April 29	Santa Clara*	–	Gail Miller Field	byutv.org	3–2	Chloe Temples (12–3)	Hannah Edwards (6–7)	Autumn Moffat-Korth (2)	354	33–10	6–2
April 30	Santa Clara*	–	Gail Miller Field	BYUtv	4–2	Autumn Moffat-Korth (14–7)	Sage Hager (8–4)	Chloe Temples (2)	479	34–10	7–2

May

Date	Opponent	Rank	Site/stadium	Television	Score	Win	Loss	Save	Attendance	Overall record	WCC record
May 3	at Utah	–	Dumke Family Softball Field	P12+ UTAH	Cancelled- Snow						
May 4	at Utah Valley	–	Wolverine Field	WAC DN	10–5	Chloe Temples (13–3)	Katie Zuniga (8–9)	None	311	35–10	–
May 6	at Pacific*	–	Bill Simoni Field	SCS Atlantic	3–0	Autumn Moffat-Korth (15–7)	Amiyah Aponte (5–8)	None	175	36–10	8–2
May 6	at Pacific*	–	Bill Simoni Field	SCS Atlantic	10–0	Chloe Temples (14–3)	Hannah Glad (1–6)	None	155	37–10	9–2
May 7	at Pacific*	–	Bill Simoni Field	WCC Net	11–0 ^{(5)}	Autumn Moffat-Korth (16–7)	Hannah Glad (1–7)	None	112	38–10	10–2
May 10	Utah State	–	Gail Miller Field	byutv.org	9–1 ^{(6)}	Autumn Moffat-Korth (17–7)	Kapri Toone (12–8)	None	378	39–10	–
May 13	Saint Mary's*	–	Gail Miller Field	BYUtv	15–0 ^{(5)}	Autumn Moffat-Korth (18–7)	Sofia Earle (9–13)	None	465	40–10	11–2
May 13	Saint Mary's*	–	Gail Miller Field	BYUtv	6–1	Chloe Temples (15–3)	Kayla Scott (4–13)	None	465	41–10	12–2
May 14	Saint Mary's*	–	Gail Miller Field	byutv.org	10–0 ^{(5)}	Autumn Moffat-Korth (19–7)	Sofia Earle (9–14)	None	589	42–10	13–2

Rankings from NFCA. Parenthesis indicate tournament seedings.
*West Coast Conference games

== TV and streaming broadcast information ==
- UNLV: Wyatt Tomcheck
- Cal State Bakersfield: No commentary
- Hawai'i: No commentary
- Cal State Bakersfield: No commentary
- Hawai'i: No commentary
- Stanford: Joaquin Wallace & Jenna Becerra
- San Jose State: Jenna Becerra
- UC Irvine: Joaquin Wallace
- Seattle U: Joaquin Wallace & Jenna Becerra
- Bethune-Cookman: Gavin Schall
- Tennessee: Gavin Schall
- California Baptist: Mike Barnes, Amanda Freed, & Chelsea Reber
- Long Beach State: Mike Barnes, Amanda Freed, & Chelsea Reber
- San Diego State: Nick Rice
- UC San Diego: Ted Mendenhall
- Arizona State: Simon Williams, Ashley Stevens, & Joseph Cena
- Grand Canyon: Jack O'Hara
- Maine: Spencer Linton & Gary Sheide
- Idaho State: Spencer Linton & Gary Sheide
- Southern Utah DH: Jarom Jordan & Gary Sheide
- Oregon: Spencer Linton & Gary Sheide
- Iowa State DH: Spencer Linton & Jason Shepherd
- Iowa State: Spencer Linton & Jason Shepherd
- New Mexico DH: Jason Shepherd & Rylee Jensen
- New Mexico: Spencer Linton & Rylee Jensen
- Loyola Marymount DH: Spencer Linton & Rylee Jensen
- Loyola Marymount: Spencer Linton & Rylee Jensen
- Utah Valley: Spencer Linton & Jason Shepherd
- San Diego: No commentary
- San Diego DH: No commentary
- Dixie State: Keric Seegmiller
- Southern Utah: Spencer McLaughlin
- Santa Clara DH: Spencer Linton & Rylee Jensen
- Santa Clara: Spencer Linton & Rylee Jensen
- Utah Valley: Ryan Pickens & Josh Kallunki
- Pacific DH: Paul Muyskens
- Pacific: Paul Muyskens
- Utah State: Spencer Linton & Jason Shepherd
- Saint Mary's DH: Spencer Linton & Rylee Jensen
- Saint Mary's: Spencer Linton & Rylee Jensen

== See also ==
- 2021 BYU Cougars football team
- 2021–22 BYU Cougars men's basketball team
- 2021–22 BYU Cougars women's basketball team
- 2021 BYU Cougars women's soccer team
- 2021 BYU Cougars women's volleyball team
- 2022 BYU Cougars men's volleyball team
- 2022 BYU Cougars baseball team
