= 2023 BYU Cougars baseball team =

American college baseball season

2023 BYU Cougars baseball
- Conference: West Coast Conference
- Record: 24–28 (13–14 WCC)
- Head coach: Trent Pratt (1st season)
- Assistant coaches: Brent Haring (11th season); Abe Alvarez (1st season)
- Home stadium: Larry H. Miller Field

2023 West Coast Conference baseball standings
	Conf.						Overall
Team	W		L		T	PCT	W		L		T	PCT
Loyola Marymount ‍†‍‍	21	–	6	–	0	.778	29	–	22	–	0	.569
Portland ‍‍‍	17	–	10	–	0	.630	29	–	21	–	0	.580
Santa Clara ‍‍‡‍^{y}	17	–	10	–	0	.630	31	–	18	–	0	.633
San Diego ‍‍‍	17	–	10	–	0	.630	24	–	23	–	1	.510
Saint Mary's ‍‍‍	14	–	13	–	0	.519	21	–	26	–	0	.447
Gonzaga ‍‍‍	14	–	13	–	0	.519	18	–	33	–	0	.353
BYU ‍‍‍	13	–	14	–	0	.481	24	–	28	–	0	.462
Pepperdine ‍‍‍	8	–	19	–	0	.296	19	–	30	–	0	.388
San Francisco ‍‍‍	8	–	19	–	0	.296	18	–	29	–	0	.383
Pacific ‍‍‍	6	–	21	–	0	.222	14	–	35	–	0	.286
† – Conference champion ‡ – Tournament champion y – Invited to the NCAA Tournament; As of May 20, 2023; Rankings from D1Baseball

The 2023 BYU Cougars baseball team represented Brigham Young University during the 2023 NCAA Division I baseball season. Trent Pratt acted as the new head coach of the BYU Cougars baseball team after taking over the interim duties the prior season.

The Cougars were competing as members of the WCC for the final season, as they later joined the Big 12 Conference for 2024. The Cougars enter the 2023 WCC season picked to finish third. They return 21 players from 2022.

== 2023 roster ==
2023 BYU Cougars roster
Pitchers: 3 Boston Mabeus – Junior; 7 Cooper Vest – Sophomore; 8 Cutter Clawson – Freshman; 9 Payton Gubler – Freshman; 16 Mason Olson – Junior; 19 Bryce Robison – Junior; 21 Jack Sterner – (redshirt) Junior; 23 Peyton Cole – Junior; 26 Carter Smith – Junior; 28 Justis Reiser – (redshirt) Freshman; 30 Jameson Ferraro – Freshman; 31 Reid McLaughlin – (redshirt) Senior; 34 Jackson Hollinghaus – Freshman; 36 Carter Foss – Sophomore; 37 Ben Hansen – Freshman; 38 Trevor Doney – Freshman; 42 Jake Porter – Sophomore; 44 Zac Dart – Freshman; 45 Sam Beck – Freshman	Infielders: 2 Brock Watkins – Junior; 5 Ozzie Pratt – Sophomore; 7 Cooper Vest – Sophomore; 8 Cutter Clawson – Freshman; 9 Payton Gubler – Freshman; 10 Safea Mauai - Sophomore; 12 Cam Decker - Freshman; 14 Alex Sardina – Junior; 25 Austin Deming – Senior; 32 Easton Jones – Freshman; 35 Jacob Wilk- Senior; 43 Chad Call – Freshman; 45 Sam Beck – Freshman	Catchers: 18 Collin Reuter – Sophomore; 24 Easton Romero – Freshman; 29 Chase Peterson – Senior; 39 Bryant Ball – Freshman; 40 Parker Goff - Freshman; Outfielders: 4 Tate Gambill – Junior; 6 Dawsen Hall – Junior; 7 Cooper Vest – Sophomore; 10 Safea Mauai - Sophomore; 11 Luke Anderson – Freshman; 17 Joshua Cowden – Senior; 22 Cole Gambill – Senior; 24 Easton Romero – Freshman; 27 Ryan Sepede – Senior; 34 Jackson Hollingshaus – Freshman

== Schedule ==
2023 BYU Cougars game log
Regular season
February

Date	Opponent	Rank	Site/stadium	Television	Score	Win	Loss	Save	Attendance	Overall record	WCC record
February 17	at Louisiana Tech	–	J. C. Love Field at Pat Patterson Park	CUSA TV	10–1	Jack Sterner (1–0)	Jonathan Fincher (0–1)	None	2,204	1–0	–
February 18	at Louisiana Tech	–	J. C. Love Field at Pat Patterson Park	CUSA TV	6–8	Landon Tomkins (1–0)	Patton Gubler (0–1)	None	1,917	1–1	–
February 18	at Louisiana Tech	–	J. C. Love Field at Pat Patterson Park	CUSA TV	8–2	Cutter Clawson (1–0)	Rawley Hector (0–1)	None	1,917	2–1	–
February 20	at Louisiana Tech	–	J. C. Love Field at Pat Patterson Park	CUSA TV	2–10	Ethan Bates (1–0)	Carter Smith (0–1)	None	1,748	2–2	–
February 22	at Louisiana	–	M. L. Tigue Moore Field at Russo Park	None	3–4	Blake Marshall (1–0)	Jake Porter (0–1)	None	3,896	2–3	–
February 23	at Louisiana	–	M. L. Tigue Moore Field at Russo Park	ESPN+	0–11	Tommy Ray (1–0)	Jack Sterner (1–1)	None	3,771	2–4	–
February 24	at Louisiana	–	M. L. Tigue Moore Field at Russo Park	None	1–2	Blake Marshall (2–0)	Mason Olson (0–1)	None	4,098	2–5	–
February 25	at Louisiana	–	M. L. Tigue Moore Field at Russo Park	ESPN+	10–11	Cooper Rawls (2–0)	Jake Porter (0–2)	Carson Fluno (1)	4,139	2–6	–
February 28	at Utah Valley	–	UCCU Ballpark	WAC DN	Cancelled- Snowstorm						

March

Date	Opponent	Rank	Site/stadium	Television	Score	Win	Loss	Save	Attendance	Overall record	WCC record
March 2	Omaha	–	Larry H. Miller Field	byutv.org	12–11 ^{(10)}	Sam Beck (1–0)	Rans Sanders (0–1)	None	854	3–6	–
March 3	Omaha	–	Larry H. Miller Field	byutv.org	8–4	Bryce Robison (1–0)	Luke Gainer (0–2)	None	955	4–6	–
March 4	Omaha	–	Larry H. Miller Field	byutv.org	4–16	Charlie Bell (1–1)	Cutter Clawson (1–1)	None	1,206	4–7	–
March 7	at Utah Tech	–	Bruce Hurst Field	WAC DN	9–10	Britton Porter (2–1)	Jake Porter (0–3)	None	1,008	4–8	–
March 9	at Creighton	–	Charles Schwab Field Omaha	FloBaseball	Cancelled- Snowstorm						
March 10	vs. Creighton	–	Hoglund Ballpark	FloBaseball	6–8	Tommy Steier (2–0)	Sam Beck (1–1)	Paul Bergstrom (1)	75	4–9	–
March 11	vs. Creighton	–	Hoglund Ballpark	FloBaseball	5–15 ^{(7)}	Anthony Watts (1–1)	Bryce Robison (1–1)	None	75	4–10	–
March 14	Utah	–	Larry H. Miller Field	byutv.org	7–0	Mason Olson (1–1)	TJ Clarkson (1–1)	None	1,311	5–10	–
March 16	at Loyola Marymount*	–	George C. Page Stadium	SCS Pacific	2–12	Diego Barrera (2–1)	Jack Sterner (1–2)	None	258	5–11	0–1
March 17	at Loyola Marymount*	–	George C. Page Stadium	WCC Net	8–0	Bryce Robison (2–1)	Zach Kirby (0–3)	None	263	6–11	1–1
March 18	at Loyola Marymount*	–	George C. Page Stadium	WCC Net	9–10	Jimmy Galacia (1–1)	Jake Porter (0–4)	None	337	6–12	1–2
March 21	Utah Valley	–	Larry H. Miller Field	byutv.org	15–7	Peyton Cole (1–0)	Davis Spencer (1–1)	None	1,076	7–12	–
March 23	Saint Mary's*	–	Larry H. Miller Field	BYUtv	8–11	Ryan Wiltse (1–5)	Jake Porter (0–5)	John Damozonio (2)	581	7–13	1–3
March 25	Saint Mary's*	–	Larry H. Miller Field	byutv.org	4–6	Adam Enyart (2–0)	Cutter Clawsen (1–2)	Riley Lamb (1)	676	7–14	1–4
March 25	Saint Mary's	–	Larry H. Miller Field	byutv.org	4–3	Jake Porter (1–5)	Ryan Taurek (0–1)	None	676	8–14	2–4
March 28	at Utah Valley	–	UCCU Ballpark	ESPN+	8–9	Colton Kennedy (2–0)	Sam Beck (1–2)	None	987	8–15	–
March 30	at Gonzaga*	–	Patterson Baseball Complex	SCS Pacific	1–5	Owen Wild (2–3)	Mason Olson (1–2)	Bradley Mullan (1)	503	8–16	2–5
March 31	at Gonzaga*	–	Patterson Baseball Complex	WCC Net	6–5	Bryce Robison (3–1)	Jack Moffitt (0–1)	Boston Mabeus (1)	419	9–16	3–5

April

Date	Opponent	Rank	Site/stadium	Television	Score	Win	Loss	Save	Attendance	Overall record	WCC record
April 1	at Gonzaga*	–	Patterson Baseball Complex	SWX; SCS Atlantic	2–8	Nate Deschryver (3–2)	Ben Hansen (0–1)	Ty Buckner (1)	N/A	9–17	3–6
April 3	at Washington State	–	Bailey–Brayton Field	P12	1–6	McKabe Cottrell (1–0)	Carter Smith (0–2)	None	1,320	9–18	–
April 6	San Francisco*	–	Larry H. Miller Field	byutv.org	6–2	Mason Olson (2–2)	Ryan Yerby (0–2)	None	1,315	10–18	4–6
April 7	San Francisco*	–	Larry H. Miller Field	BYUtv	5–15	Jesse Barron (3–1)	Bryce Robison (3–2)	None	1,917	10–19	4–7
April 8	San Francisco*	–	Larry H. Miller Field	byutv.org	15–6	Carter Smith (1–2)	Adam Shew (3–3)	None	2,210	11–19	5–7
April 11	Utah Tech	–	Larry H. Miller Field	byutv.org	8–5	Peyton Cole (2–0)	Ryan Hardman (0–6)	Boston Mabeus (2)	1,702	12–19	–
April 13	at Santa Clara*	–	Stephen Schott Stadium	SCS Central	6–11	Blake Hammond (3–1)	Mason Olson (2–3)	None	300	12–20	5–8
April 14	at Santa Clara*	–	Stephen Schott Stadium	SCS Central	13–8	Bryce Robison (4–2)	Nick Sando (1–2)	Cutter Clawson (1)	343	13–20	6–8
April 15	at Santa Clara*	–	Stephen Schott Stadium	SCS Central	5–4	Jake Porter (2–5)	Skylar Hales (3–3)	Boston Mabeus (3)	415	14–20	7–8
April 18	Utah	–	Larry H. Miller Field	byutv.org	14–29	Bransen Kuehl (1–0)	Jameson Ferraro (0–1)	None	2,106	14–21	–
April 20	UNCG	–	Larry H. Miller Field	BYUtv	14–8	Mason Olson (3–3)	Jay Miller (1–6)	None	968	15–21	–
April 21	UNCG	–	Larry H. Miller Field	byutv.org	19–8 ^{(7)}	Bryce Robison (5–2)	Luke Thomas (2–4)	None	1,539	16–21	–
April 22	UNCG	–	Larry H. Miller Field	BYUtv	13–11	Carter Smith (2–2)	Matt Kemp (4–3)	Boston Mabeus (4)	1,488	17–21	–
April 27	Portland*	–	Larry H. Miller Field	byutv.org	9–8 ^{(10)}	Boston Mabeus (1–0)	Ryan Rembisz (0–1)	None	1,879	18–21	8–8
April 28	Portland	–	Larry H. Miller Field	BYUtv	10–12	Brock Gillis (3–2)	Jake Porter (2–6)	None	2,266	18–22	8–9
April 29	Portland	–	Larry H. Miller Field	BYUtv	8–22	Nick Brink (3–0)	Ben Hansen (0–2)	None	2,377	18–23	8–10

May

Date	Opponent	Rank	Site/stadium	Television	Score	Win	Loss	Save	Attendance	Overall record	WCC record
May 2	at UC San Diego	–	Triton Ballpark	ESPN+	0–3	Ethan Holt (4–1)	Carter Foss (0–1)	Ryan Rissas (5)	226	18–24	–
May 4	at San Diego*	–	Fowler Park	SCS Atlantic	10–6	Mason Olson (4–3)	Garrett Rennie (1–3)	None	538	19–24	9–10
May 5	at San Diego*	–	Fowler Park	SCS Atlantic	4–8	Ivran Romero (2–4)	Bryce Robison (5–3)	None	573	19–25	9–11
May 6	at San Diego*	–	Fowler Park	WCC Net	1–5	Austin Smith (4–1)	Ben Hansen (0–3)	Conner Thurman (2)	521	19–26	9–12
May 9	at Utah	–	Smith's Ballpark	P12	13–7	Cutter Clawson (2–2)	Micah Ashman (1–3)	None	2,529	20–26	–
May 11	at Pacific*	–	Klein Family Field	SCS Pacific	11–8 ^{(13)}	Boston Mabeus (2–0)	Tyler Stout (3–3)	None	483	21–26	10–12
May 12	at Pacific*	–	Klein Family Field	SCS Pacific	9–2	Bryce Robison (6–3)	Caden Casagrande (0–2)	None	283	22–26	11–12
May 13	at Pacific*	–	Klein Family Field	SCS Pacific	5–11	Tyler Stout (4–3)	Ben Hansen (0–4)	None	280	22–27	11–13
May 18	Pepperdine*	–	Larry H. Miller Field	byutv.org	13–7	Mason Olson (5–3)	Shane Telfer (4–5)	None	2,108	23–27	12–13
May 19	Pepperdine*	–	Larry H. Miller Field	BYUtv	17–9	Bryce Robison (7–3)	Bobby Christy (1–1)	None	3,053	24–27	13–13
May 20	Pepperdine*	–	Larry H. Miller Field	BYUtv	6–19	Nick Bonn (5–1)	Ben Hansen (0–5)	None	2,775	24–28	13–14

Rankings from Collegiate Baseball. Parenthesis indicate tournament seedings.
*West Coast Conference games

== Rivalries ==
BYU has two main rivalries on their schedule- the Deseret First Duel vs. Utah and the UCCU Crosstown Clash vs. Utah Valley. Utah Tech (formerly Dixie State) also plays the Cougars for a third consecutive season.

== Radio Information ==
BYU Baseball was once again broadcast as part of the NuSkin BYU Sports Network. BYU Radio 107.9 KUMT served as the flagship station. However, due to conflicts Game 2 on February 18 (Louisiana Tech) and April 1 (Gonzaga) were byuradio.org and the BYU Radio App exclusives. Jason Shepherd and Greg Wrubell once again rotated providing play-by-play.

== TV Announcers ==
- Louisiana Tech: Dave Nitz
- Louisiana Tech DH: Dave Nitz
- Louisiana Tech: Dave Nitz
- Louisiana: Dan McDonald & Brennan Breaux
- Louisiana: Dan McDonald & Brennan Breaux
- Omaha: Jason Shepherd
- Omaha: Jason Shepherd
- Omaha: Jason Shepherd
- Utah Tech: No commentary
- Creighton: No commentary
- Creighton: No commentary
- Utah: Dave McCann, Gary Sheide, & Jason Shepherd
- Loyola Marymount: Ghizal Hasan
- Loyola Marymount: Ghizal Hasan
- Loyola Marymount: Ghizal Hasan
- Utah Valley: Dave McCann & Gary Sheide
- Saint Mary's: Dave McCann, Gary Sheide, & Jason Shepherd
- Saint Mary's: Dave McCann, Gary Sheide, & Jason Shepherd
- Saint Mary's: Dave McCann, Gary Sheide, & Jason Shepherd
- Utah Valley: Jordan Bianucci & Brice Larson
- Gonzaga: Greg Talbott & Jack Krauel
- Gonzaga: Greg Talbott & Billy Moon
- Gonzaga: Larry Weir & Billy Moon
- Washington State: Trevor Williams
- San Francisco: Dave McCann, Gary Sheide, & Jason Shepherd
- San Francisco: Dave McCann, Gary Sheide, & Jason Shepherd
- San Francisco: Dave McCann, Gary Sheide, & Jason Shepherd
- Utah Tech: Dave McCann, Gary Sheide, & Jason Shepherd
- Santa Clara: Kevin Danna
- Santa Clara: Kevin Danna
- Santa Clara: No commentary
- Utah: Dave McCann, Gary Sheide, & Jason Shepherd
- UNCG: Dave McCann, Gary Sheide, & Jason Shepherd
- UNCG: Dave McCann, Gary Sheide, & Jason Shepherd
- UNCG: Dave McCann, Gary Sheide, & Jason Shepherd
- Portland: Dave McCann, Gary Sheide, & Jason Shepherd
- Portland: Dave McCann, Gary Sheide, & Jason Shepherd
- Portland: Dave McCann, Gary Sheide, & Jason Shepherd
- UC San Diego: Ted Mendenhall
- San Diego: Jack Cronin
- San Diego: Jack Cronin
- San Diego: Jack Cronin
- Utah: Thad Anderson & Bill Kinneberg
- Pacific: Dennis Ackerman
- Pacific: Dennis Ackerman
- Pacific: Dennis Ackerman
- Pepperdine: Dave McCann, Gary Sheide, & Jason Shepherd
- Pepperdine: Dave McCann, Gary Sheide, & Jason Shepherd
- Pepperdine: Dave McCann, Gary Sheide, & Jason Shepherd

== See also ==
- 2022 BYU Cougars football team
- 2022–23 BYU Cougars men's basketball team
- 2022–23 BYU Cougars women's basketball team
- 2022 BYU Cougars women's soccer team
- 2022 BYU Cougars women's volleyball team
- 2023 BYU Cougars men's volleyball team
- 2023 BYU Cougars softball team
