= 2023 BYU Cougars softball team =

American college softball season

2023 BYU Cougars softball

NISC, Runner-up
- Conference: West Coast Conference
- Record: 35–17 (11–4 WCC)
- Head coach: Gordon Eakin (21st season)
- Assistant coaches: Pete Meredith (10th season); Todd Judge (1st season)
- Home stadium: Gail Miller Field

2023 West Coast Conference softball standings
	Conf.						Overall
Team	W		L		T	PCT	W		L		T	PCT
Loyola Marymount ‍†‍‍^{y}	12	–	3	–	0	.800	26	–	23	–	0	.531
BYU ‍‍‍	11	–	4	–	0	.733	35	–	17	–	0	.673
Saint Mary's ‍‍‍	9	–	6	–	0	.600	20	–	29	–	0	.408
San Diego ‍‍‍	8	–	7	–	0	.533	23	–	29	–	1	.443
Santa Clara ‍‍‍	4	–	11	–	0	.267	23	–	26	–	0	.469
Pacific ‍‍‍	1	–	14	–	0	.067	10	–	30	–	0	.250
† – Conference champion y – Invited to the NCAA tournament As of May 20, 2023; Rankings from NFCA/USA Today

The 2023 BYU Cougars softball team represented Brigham Young University in the 2023 NCAA Division I softball season. Gordon Eakin entered the year as head coach of the Cougars for a 21st consecutive season. 2023 was the tenth and final season for the Cougars as members of the WCC in softball as they joined the Big 12 Conference for the 2024 season. The Cougars entered 2023 having won their last 13 conference championships and having been picked as the favorites to win the 2023 WCC title.

== 2023 roster ==
2023 BYU Cougars roster
Pitchers: 13 Delaney Baker - Freshman; 14 Alyssa Aguilar - Sophomore; 18 Kaysen Korth - Freshman; 33 Lo Salcedo - Junior; 38 Chloe Temples - Senior; 44 Hina Huber - Freshman; 50 Ailana Agbayani - Freshman; Catchers: 3 Macy Simmons - Senior; 8 Emma Andrewjeski - Sophomore; 24 Angelina Camen - Sophomore; 40 Jolee Benson - Freshman	Infielders: 4 Mallory Barber - Senior; 5 Ella Herrewig - Freshman; 7 Alyssa Aguilar - Senior; 16 Breezy Hayward - Freshman; 20 Hailey Morrow - Freshman; 28 Tristen Turlington - Freshman; 30 Maddie Udall - Freshman; 50 Ailana Agbayani - Freshman; 54 Huntyr Ava - Senior; 55 Martha Epenesa - Senior	Outfielders: 11 Jaelynn Lambert - Sophomore; 12 Lauren Flanders - Sophomore; 15 Taryn Lennon - Junior; 17 Alexis Gilio - Sophomore; 22 Maddie Bejarano - Junior; 23 Violet Zavodnik - Junior; 28 Tristen Turlington - Freshman; 51 Lexie Bennett - Sophomore

== Schedule ==
2023 BYU Cougars game log
Puerto Vallarta College Challenge
February

Date	Opponent	Rank	Site/stadium	Television	Score	Win	Loss	Save	Attendance	Overall record	WCC record
February 9	vs. North Carolina	–	Nancy Almaraz Field	FloSoftball	0–2	Bailey McCachren (1–0)	Chloe Temples (0–1)	None	184	0–1	–
February 9	vs. Wisconsin	–	Nancy Almaraz Field	FloSoftball	1–0	Kaysen Korth (1–0)	Maddie Schwartz (0–1)	None	N/A	1–1	–
February 10	vs. Maryland	–	Nancy Almaraz Field	FloSoftball	2–10 ^{(5)}	Trinity Schlotterbeck (1–0)	Kaysen Korth (1–1)	None	500	1–2	–
February 11	vs. North Dakota State	–	Nancy Almaraz Field	FloSoftball	10–1 ^{(5)}	Chloe Temples (1–1)	Lainey Lyle (0–1)	None	248	2–2	–

Littlewood Classic
February

Date	Opponent	Rank	Site/stadium	Television	Score	Win	Loss	Save	Attendance	Overall record	WCC record
February 16	at #22 Arizona State	–	Alberta B. Farrington Softball Stadium	P12 OR	10–5	Kaysen Korth (2–1)	Mac Osborne (1–2)	None	1,213	3–2	–
February 17	vs. San Jose State	–	Alberta B. Farrington Softball Stadium		7–5	Ailana Agbayani (1–0)	Olivia Grey (2–2)	None	350	4–2	–
February 17	vs. Oregon State	–	Alberta B. Farrington Softball Stadium		3–2	Kaysen Korth (3–1)	Tarni Stepto (1–2)	None	520	5–2	–
February 18	vs. Illinois State	–	Alberta B. Farrington Softball Stadium		2–1 ^{(8)}	Chloe Temples (2–1)	Hannah Meshnick (1–1)	None	308	6–2	–
February 18	vs. DePaul	–	Alberta B. Farrington Softball Stadium		13–7	Alyssa Aguilar (1–0)	Bella Nigey (2–2)	None	412	7–2	–

Mary Nutter Collegiate Classic
February

Date	Opponent	Rank	Site/stadium	Television	Score	Win	Loss	Save	Attendance	Overall record	WCC record
February 23	vs. #21 Missouri	–	Big League Dreams Complex	FloSoftball	3–11 ^{(5)}	Jordan Weber (3–2)	Ailana Agbayani (1–1)	None	286	7–3	–
February 23	vs. Texas A&M	–	Big League Dreams Complex	FloSoftball	6–8	Emiley Kennedy (3–0)	Kaysen Korth (3–2)	Shaylee Ackerman (1)	N/A	7–4	–
February 24	vs. San Diego State	–	Big League Dreams Complex	FloSoftball	1–4	Sarah Lehman (4–0)	Chloe Temples (2–2)	Allie Light (4)	108	7–5	–
February 25	vs. Long Beach State	–	Big League Dreams Complex	FloSoftball	6–5	Kaysen Korth (4–2)	Sophia Fernandez (0–2)	None	264	8–5	–

Trailblazer Tournament
March

Date	Opponent	Rank	Site/stadium	Television	Score	Win	Loss	Save	Attendance	Overall record	WCC record
March 2	vs. Oregon State	–	Karl Brooks Field	WAC DN	4–7	Sarah Haendiges (4–3)	Chloe Temples (2–3)	Ellie Garcia (2)	109	8–6	–
March 3	vs. UNLV	–	Karl Brooks Field	WAC DN	9–2	Kaysen Korth (5–2)	Jessie Fontes (3–3)	None	100	9–6	–
March 3	vs. Portland State	–	Karl Brooks Field	WAC DN	8–3	Kaysen Korth (6–2)	Sherrei Nakoa-Chung (0–4)	None	129	10–6	–
March 4	vs. Idaho State	–	Karl Brooks Field	WAC DN	4–3	Kaysen Korth (7–2)	Jordan Schuring (2–4)	None	125	11–6	–

Regular season
March

Date	Opponent	Rank	Site/stadium	Television	Score	Win	Loss	Save	Attendance	Overall record	WCC record
March 15	Utah	–	Gail Miller Field	byutv.org	PPD until 4/10- Snowstorm						
March 16	at Utah Tech	–	Karl Brooks Field	WAC DN	3–1	Kaysen Korth (8–2)	Sauren Garton (7–3)	None	157	12–6	–

Iowa State Invitational
March

Date	Opponent	Rank	Site/stadium	Television	Score	Win	Loss	Save	Attendance	Overall record	WCC record
March 17	at Iowa State	–	Cyclone Sports Complex	ESPN+	Cancelled- low temps						
March 17	at Iowa State	–	Cyclone Sports Stadium	ESPN+	Cancelled- low temps						
March 18	vs. Omaha	–	Cyclone Sports Stadium		Cancelled- low temps						
March 18	vs. Omaha	–	Cyclone Sports Stadium		Cancelled- low temps						

Regular season
March

Date	Opponent	Rank	Site/stadium	Television	Score	Win	Loss	Save	Attendance	Overall record	WCC record
March 18	Idaho State	–	Gail Miller Field	byutv.org	10–1 ^{(5)}	Chloe Temples (3–3)	Emma McMurray (1–6)	None	337	13–6	–
March 18	Idaho State	–	Gail Miller Field	byutv.org	12–0 ^{(5)}	Kaysen Korth (9–2)	Rylee Peters (0–1)	None	337	14–6	–
March 21	Boise State	–	Gail Miller Field	byutv.org	3–8	Taylor Caudill (6–5)	Chloe Temples (3–4)	None	120	14–7	–
March 23	Utah State	–	Gail Miller Field	byutv.org	Cancelled- inclement weather						
March 25	Idaho State	–	Gail Miller Field	BYUtv	Cancelled- inclement weather						
March 25	Idaho State	–	Gail Miller Field	BYUtv	Cancelled- inclement weather						
March 27	at Utah Tech	–	Karl Brooks Field	ESPN+	14–11	Ailana Agbayani (2–1)	Ashtyn Bauerle (0–1)	None	274	15–7	–

Purple & Gold Challenge
March

Date	Opponent	Rank	Site/stadium	Television	Score	Win	Loss	Save	Attendance	Overall record	WCC record
March 30	at #12 LSU	–	Tiger Park	SEC+	2–3	Sydney Berzon (10–2)	Ailana Agbayani (2–2)	None	1,650	15–8	–
March 31	vs. Louisiana Tech	–	Tiger Park		5–3	Kaysen Korth (10–2)	Brook Melnychuk (4–5)	None	326	16–8	–
March 31	at #12 LSU	–	Tiger Park	SEC+	2–10 ^{(5)}	Raelin Chaffin (4–1)	Chloe Temples (3–5)	None	1,697	16–9	–

April

Date	Opponent	Rank	Site/stadium	Television	Score	Win	Loss	Save	Attendance	Overall record	WCC record
April 1	vs. NC State	–	Tiger Park		1–0	Alyssa Aguilar (2–0)	Madison Inscoe (7–8)	None	127	17–9	–

Regular season
April

Date	Opponent	Rank	Site/stadium	Television	Score	Win	Loss	Save	Attendance	Overall record	WCC record
April 4	at Idaho State	–	Miller Ranch Stadium	ESPN+	Cancelled- inclement weather						
April 7	at Santa Clara*	–	SCU Softball Field	SCS Atlantic	4–3	Kaysen Korth (11–2)	Hannah Edwards (6–4)	None	153	18–9	1–0
April 7	at Santa Clara*	–	SCU Softball Field	SCS Atlantic	8–2	Chloe Temples (4–5)	Hazyl Gray (3–5)	None	153	19–9	2–0
April 8	at Santa Clara*	–	SCU Softball Field	WCC Net	8–0 ^{(5)}	Kaysen Korth (12–2)	Sage Hager (8–4)	None	162	20–9	3–0
April 10	at #24 Utah	–	Gail Miller Field	byutv.org	4–6	Mariah Lopez (10–2)	Kaysen Korth (12–3)	None	1,800	20–10	–
April 11	Utah Valley	–	Gail Miller Field	byutv.org	9–0 ^{(5)}	Chloe Temples (5–5)	Jorja Barrett (2–2)	None	478	21–10	–
April 14	at Loyola Marymount	–	Smith Field	SCS Pacific	2–3	Jenna Perez (8–9)	Kaysen Korth (12–4)	None	236	21–11	3–1
April 15	at Loyola Marymount*	–	Smith Field	SCS Central	2–5	Jenna Perez (9–9)	Kaysen Korth (12–5)	None	N/A	21–12	3–2
April 15	at Loyola Marymount*	–	Smith Field	SCS Central	5–2	Ailana Agbayani (3–2)	Savannah Hooks (2–2)	None	N/A	22–12	4–2
April 17	#5 Stanford	–	Gail Miller Field	byutv.org	0–1	NiJaree Canady (9–0)	Kaysen Korth (12–6)	Alana Vawter (6)	243	22–13	–
April 19	at Utah Valley	–	Wolverine Field	ESPN+	6–5	Ailana Agbayani (4–2)	Katie Zuniga (7–11)	Kaysen Korth (1)	287	23–13	–
April 26	Utah State	–	Gail Miller Field	byutv.org	10–5	Ailana Agbayani (5–2)	Hailey McLean (5–5)	None	320	24–13	–
April 26	Utah Tech	–	Gail Miller Field	byutv.org	4–3	Kaysen Korth (13–6)	Attlyn Johnston (8–6)	None	478	25–13	–
April 28	San Diego*	–	Gail Miller Field	byutv.org	8–1	Kaysen Korth (14–6)	Madison Earnshaw (8–5)	None	378	26–13	5–2
April 28	San Diego*	–	Gail Miller Field	byutv.org	12–1 ^{(5)}	Chloe Temples (6–5)	Courtney Rose (2–7)	None	316	27–13	6–2
April 29	San Diego*	–	Gail Miller Field	byutv.org	8–0	Kaysen Korth (15–6)	Kelsey Tadlock (1–8)	None	491	28–13	7–2

May

Date	Opponent	Rank	Site/stadium	Television	Score	Win	Loss	Save	Attendance	Overall record	WCC record
May 1	#2 UCLA	–	Gail Miller Field	BYUtv	2–7	Brooke Yanez (15–1)	Kaysen Korth )15–7)	None	619	28–14	–
May 5	Pacific*	–	Gail Miller Field	byutv.org	10–2 ^{(6)}	Kaysen Korth (16–7)	Vanessa Strong (4–7)	None	443	29–14	8–2
May 5	Pacific*	–	Gail Miller Field	byutv.org	6–3 ^{(9)}	Kaysen Korth (17–7)	Desiree Smith (0–3)	None	363	30–14	9–2
May 6	Pacific*	–	Gail Miller Field	BYUtv	8–0 ^{(5)}	Chloe Temples (7–5)	Vanessa Strong (4–7)	None	723	31–14	10–2
May 12	at Saint Mary's*	–	Cottrell Field	SCS Atlantic	1–0	Kaysen Korth (18–7)	Odhi Vasquez (7–6)	None	150	32–14	11–2
May 13	at Saint Mary's*	–	Cottrell Field	SCS Atlantic	0–2	Kailey O'Connor (5–12)	Chloe Temples (7–6)	None	250	32–15	11–3
May 13	at Saint Mary's*	–	Cottrell Field	SCS Atlantic	0–2	Avery Wolverton (6–6)	Kaysen Korth (18–8)	None	250	32–16	11–4

NISC Tournament
May

Date	Opponent	Rank	Site/stadium	Television	Score	Win	Loss	Save	Attendance	Overall record	WCC record
May 18	vs. San Jose State	–	Triple Crown Sports Red Rocks Field	YouTube	5–2	Kaysen Korth (19–8)	Lacie Ham (7–15)	None	N/A	33–16	–
May 19	vs. Maryland	–	Triple Crown Sports Red Rocks Field	YouTube	6–4	Chloe Temples (8–6)	Trinty Schlotter (15–7)	None	N/A	34–16	–
May 20	vs. South Dakota State	–	Triple Crown Sports Red Rocks Field	YouTube	5–0	Chloe Temples (9–6)	Tori Kniesche (24–7)	None	N/A	35–16	–
May 20	vs. Iowa	–	Triple Crown Sports Red Rocks Field	YouTube	7–9	Jalen Adams (10–13)	Ailana Agbayani (5–3)	None	N/A	35–17	–

Rankings from NFCA. Parenthesis indicate tournament seedings.
*West Coast Conference games

== TV and Streaming Broadcast Information ==
- North Carolina: Scott Sudikoff & KJ Sanchelli
- Wisconsin: Scott Sudikoff & KJ Sanchelli
- Maryland: Corey Brooks & Karen Johns
- North Dakota State: Corey Brooks & Karen Johns
- Arizona State: Cindy Brunson
- Missouri: Chris Hooks & Joe Simmons
- Texas A&M: Chris Hooks & Joe Simmons
- San Diego State: Chris Hooks & Joe Simmons
- Long Beach State: Jill Guerin
- Oregon State: No commentary
- UNLV: No commentary
- Portland State: No commentary
- Idaho State: No commentary
- Utah Tech: No commentary
- Idaho State DH: Dave McCann & Gary Sheide
- Boise State: Spencer Linton & Jason Shepherd
- Utah Tech: Kylee Young
- LSU: Lyn Rollins & Yvette Girouard
- LSU: Lyn Rollins & Yvette Girouard
- Santa Clara DH: Daniel Brewer
- Santa Clara: Greg Mroz
- Utah: Spencer Linton & Taylei Williams
- Utah Valley: Spencer Linton
- Loyola Marymount: Jonah Malkin
- Loyola Marymount DH: Jonah Malkin
- Stanford: Spencer Linton & Taylei Williams
- Utah Valley: Brice Larson
- Utah State: Spencer Linton & Taylei Williams
- Utah Tech: Spencer Linton & Jason Shepherd
- San Diego DH: Spencer Linton & Taylei Williams
- San Diego: Spencer Linton & Taylei Williams
- UCLA: Spencer Linton & Taylei Williams
- Pacific DH: Spencer Linton & Taylei Williams
- Pacific: Spencer Linton & Taylei Williams
- Saint Mary's: Brian Brownfield & Rodrigo Delore
- Saint Mary's DH: Brian Brownfield & Rodrigo Delore
- San Jose State: Matthew Wozniak
- Maryland: No commentary
- South Dakota State: Thomas Hoffman
- Iowa: Thomas Hoffman

== See also ==
- 2022 BYU Cougars football team
- 2022–23 BYU Cougars men's basketball team
- 2022–23 BYU Cougars women's basketball team
- 2022 BYU Cougars women's soccer team
- 2022 BYU Cougars women's volleyball team
- 2023 BYU Cougars men's volleyball team
- 2023 BYU Cougars baseball team
