= 2021 BYU Cougars softball team =

American college softball season

2021 BYU Cougars softball
- Conference: West Coast Conference
- Record: 38–17 (11–1 WCC)
- Head coach: Gordon Eakin (19th season)
- Assistant coaches: Pete Meredith (8th season); AJ Taulai'i (4th season)
- Home stadium: Gail Miller Field

2021 West Coast Conference softball standings
	Conf.						Overall
Team	W		L		T	PCT	W		L		T	PCT
BYU ‍†‍‍^{y}	11	–	1	–	0	.917	38	–	17	–	0	.691
Loyola Marymount ‍‍‍	10	–	5	–	0	.667	22	–	21	–	0	.512
Pacific ‍‍‍	4	–	5	–	0	.444	14	–	14	–	1	.500
Saint Mary's ‍‍‍	4	–	8	–	0	.333	13	–	24	–	0	.351
San Diego ‍‍‍	5	–	10	–	0	.333	13	–	29	–	0	.310
Santa Clara ‍‍‍	5	–	10	–	0	.333	8	–	20	–	0	.286
† – Conference champion y – Invited to the NCAA tournament Pacific suspended their season on May 5, 2021; As of May 21, 2021; Rankings from NFCA

The 2021 BYU Cougars softball team represented Brigham Young University in the 2021 NCAA Division I softball season. Gordon Eakin entered the year as head coach of the Cougars for a 19th consecutive season. 2021 was the eighth season for the Cougars as members of the WCC in softball. The Cougars entered 2021 having won their last 11 conference championships, though they never made it to conference play in 2020 due to the COVID-19 pandemic.

== 2021 roster ==
2021 BYU Cougars Roster
Pitchers: 10 Arissa Paulson – senior; 15 Taryn Lennon – freshman; 18 Lexi Atcitty – freshman; 20 Autumn Moffat-Korth – senior; 28 Carley Brown – sophomore; 33 Lo Salcedo – freshman; 77 Reggie Kanagawa – senior; Catchers: 11 Morgan Bevell – senior; 13 Bridget Fleener – junior; 14 Kaylee Erickson – sophomore; 24 Natalie Sicairos – freshman	Infielders: 3 Marissa Chavez – junior; 5 Taylei Williams – senior; 7 Alyssa Podhurcak – sophomore; 8 Emilee Erickson – senior; 10 Arissa Paulson – senior; 14 Kaylee Erickson – sophomore; 16 Brooke Hill-Barrington – junior; 17 Erin Miklus – senior; 44 Mallory Barber – junior; 54 Huntyr Aca – sophomore; 55 Martha Epenesa – junior; 77 Reggie Kanagawa – sophomore	Outfielders: 1 HannahJo Peterson – senior; 2 Rylee Jensen-McFarland – senior; 4 Ally Oyanguren – freshman; 6 Morgan Sterner – freshman; 15 Taryn Lennon – freshman; 23 Violet Zavodnik – freshman; 99 Aubrielle Paulson – junior

== Schedule ==
Date	Time	Opponent	Rank^{#}	Site	Result	Attendance	Winning Pitcher	Losing Pitcher
Kajakawa Classic
February 11*	3:00 PM	#16 Arizona State		Alberta B. Farrington Softball Stadium • Tempe, AZ	L 2–7	235	Cielo Meza (1–0)	Autumn Moffat-Korth (0–1)
February 11*	5:30 PM	#16 Arizona State		Alberta B. Farrington Softball Stadium • Tempe, AZ	L 5–7 ^{(8)}	235	Allison Royalty (1–0)	Arissa Paulson (0–1)
February 12*	3:00 PM	Utah		Alberta B. Farrington Softball Stadium • Tempe, AZ	L 0–1	146	Sydney Sandez (1–0)	Autumn Moffat-Korth (0–2)
February 13*	12:00 PM	Seattle		Alberta B. Farrington Softball Stadium • Tempe, AZ	W 4–3	132	Autumn Moffat-Korth (1–2)	Stefanie Madrigal (0–2)
St. George Classic
February 18*	1:00 PM	#2 Washington		Karl Brooks Field • St. George, UT	L 1–4	122	Gabbie Plain (2–0)	Carley Brown (0–1)
February 19*	11:00 AM	Utah State		Canyons Softball Complex • St. George, UT	W 6–3	30	Arissa Paulson (1–1)	Jessica Stewart (0–3)
February 19*	1:30 PM	Montana		Canyons Softball Complex • St. George, UT	W 9–0 ^{(5)}	30	Autumn Moffat-Korth (2–2)	Ashley Ward (0–2)
February 20*	11:00 AM	Utah Valley		Canyons Softball Complex • St. George, UT	W 7–2	50	Arissa Paulson (2–1)	Devyn Cretz
February 20*	1:30 PM	Nevada		Canyon Softball Complex • St. George, UT	W 7–1	50	Autumn Moffat-Korth (3–2)	Blake Craft (2–2)
Arizona Tournament
February 25*	2:00 PM	Seattle		Hillenbrand Stadium • Tucson, AZ	W 4–0	32	Autumn Moffat-Korth (4–2)	Shi Smith (2–4)
February 25*	5:00 PM	#3 Arizona		Hillenbrand Stadium • Tucson, AZ	L 0–12 ^{(5)}	0	Alyssa Dengam (3–0)	Arissa Paulson (2–2)
February 26*	12:00 PM	Oregon State		Hillenbrand Stadium • Tucson, AZ	L 3–10	0	Mariah Mazon (4–0)	Autumn Moffat-Korth (4–3)
February 27*	3:00 PM	Colorado State		Hillenbrand Stadium • Tucson, AZ	Canceled	CSU withdrew from Arizona Tournament due to COVID-19 protocols		
February 27*	6:00 PM	Colorado State		Hillenbrand Stadium • Tucson, AZ	Canceled	CSU withdrew from Arizona Tournament due to COVID-19 protocols		
February 27*	2:00 PM	#3 Arizona		Hillenbrand Stadium • Tucson, AZ	L 3–11 ^{(6)}	0	Mariah Lopez (3–0)	Autumn Moffat-Korth (4–4)
DeMarani Invitational
March 4*	4:30 PM	Cal		Smith Family Stadium • Stanford, CA	W 8–7 ^{(8)}	0	Carley Brown (1–1)	Sona Halijian (1–3)
March 4*	7:00 PM	Stanford		Smith Family Stadium • Stanford, CA	L 3–5	0	Alana Vawter (5–0)	Arissa Paulson (2–3)
March 5*	2:00 PM	UCSB		Smith Family Stadium • Stanford, CA	W 4–1	0	Autumn Moffat-Korth (5–4)	Alyssa Molina (0–2)
March 6*	12:30 PM	Nevada		Smith Family Stadium • Stanford, CA	Canceled	Nevada withdrew from DeMarani Tournament due to COVID-19 protocols		
March 6*	3:00 PM	Stanford		Smith Family Stadium • Stanford, CA	L 2–3	0	Alana Vawter (6–0)	Autumn Moffat-Korth (5–5)
Regular Season
March 10*	2:00 PM	Sam Houston State		Bobcat Softball Stadium • San Marcos, TX	W 12–2 ^{(5)}	0	Arissa Paulson (3–3)	Regan Dunn (2–2)
March 11*	5:00 PM	Texas State		Bobcat Softball Stadium • San Marcos, TX	L 1–2	237	Jessica Mullins (5–2)	Autumn Moffat-Korth (5–6)
March 12*	2:00 PM	UTSA		Bobcat Softball Stadium • San Marcos, TX	W 11–2 ^{(5)}	0	Arissa Paulson (4–3)	Clarissa Hernandez (1–2)
March 13*	1:00 PM	#10 Texas		Red and Charline McCombs Field • Austin, TX	L 7–10	0	Molly Jacobsen (5–1)	Autumn Moffat-Korth (5–7)
March 13*	4:00 PM	Tarleton State		Red and Charline McCombs Field • Austin, TX	W 7–1	446	Autumn Moffat-Korth (6–7)	Tristan Bridges (2–7)
March 24*	5:00 PM	Stanford		Gail Miller Field • Provo, UT	L 4–5	215	Maddy Dwyer (2–0)	Autumn Moffat-Korth (6–8)
March 26*	2:30 PM	Boise State		Gail Miller Field • Provo, UT	L 4–6	759	Hannah Bailey (4–0)	Carley Brown (1–2)
March 26*	5:00 PM	Boise State		Gail Miller Field • Provo, UT	W 4–1	759	Autumn Moffat-Korth (7–8)	Sara Johnson (0–7)
March 27*	3:30 PM	Southern Utah		Gail Miller Field • Provo, UT	W 8–0 ^{(6)}	799	Arissa Paulson (5–3)	Tyler Denhart
March 30*	5:00 PM	#14 Arizona State		Gail Miller Field • Provo, UT	Canceled	due to unknown health emergency, but it was not COVID-19 protocols		
April 1*	6:00 PM	#25 Baylor		Gail Miller Field • Provo, UT	W 4–1	280	Autumn Moffat-Korth (8–8)	Gia Rodoni (7–4)
April 2*	1:00 PM	#25 Baylor		Gail Miller Field • Provo, UT	W 7–5	379	Carley Brown (2–2)	Sidney Mansell (6–1)
April 2*	3:50 PM	#25 Baylor		Gail Miller Field • Provo, UT	W 7–5	379	Autumn Moffat-Korth (9–8)	Aliyah Binford (5–2)
April 6*	3:30 PM	Utah State		Gail Miller Field • Provo, UT	W 4–0	365	Autumn Moffat-Korth (10–8)	Jes Stewart (9–9)
April 9	4:00 PM	Saint Mary's		Louis Guisto Field • Moraga, CA	W 10–6	30	Carley Brown (3–2)	Kayla Scott (2–4)
April 10	1:00 PM	Saint Mary's		Louis Guisto Field • Moraga, CA	W 8–5	40	Arissa Paulson (6–3)	Eileen Perez (1–4)
April 10	3:00 PM	Saint Mary's		Louis Guisto Field • Moraga, CA	W 1–0	55	Autumn Moffat-Korth (11–8)	Sofia Earle (4–8)
April 13*	6:00 PM	Idaho State		Gail Miller Field • Provo, UT	W 10–1 ^{(5)}	616	Autumn Moffat-Korth (12–8)	Emma McMurray (0–5)
UCCU Crosstown Clash
April 14*	6:00 PM	Utah Valley		Gail Miller Field • Provo, UT	W 8–2	120	Arissa Paulson (7–3)	Devyn Cretz (9–10)
Regular Season
April 15*	5:00 PM	Southern Utah		Gail Miller Field • Provo, UT	W 8–0 ^{(5)}	162	Autumn Moffat-Korth (13–8)	Payton Goodrich (2–7)
Deseret First Duel
April 21*	6:00 PM	Utah		Gail Miller Field • Provo, UT	W 7–6	497	Carley Brown (4–2)	Sydney Sandez (7–5)
Regular Season
April 23	5:00 PM	San Diego		Gail Miller Field • Provo, UT	W 3–1	350	Autumn Moffat-Korth (14–8)	Madison Earnshaw (3–10)
April 23	7:00 PM	San Diego		Gail Miller Field • Provo, UT	W 11–3 ^{(5)}	350	Arissa Paulson (8–3)	Courtney Rose (1–8)
April 24	1:00 PM	San Diego		Gail Miller Field • Provo, UT	W 3–0	290	Autumn Moffat-Korth (15–8)	Madison Earnshaw (3–11)
UCCU Crosstown Clash
April 27*	5:00 PM	Utah Valley		Wolverine Field • Orem, UT	L 1–8	229	Brooke Carter (4–5)	Carley Brown (4–3)
Regular Season
April 30	3:00 PM	Loyola Marymount		Smith Field • Los Angeles, CA	W 5–2	50	Autumn Moffat-Korth (16–8)	Marina Vitalich (12–8)
May 1	1:00 PM	Loyola Marymount		Smith Field • Los Angeles, CA	L 2–3 ^{(10)}	65	Marina Vitalich (13-8)	Arissa Paulson (8–4)
May 1	4:30 PM	Loyola Marymount		Smith Field • Los Angeles, CA	W 9–1 ^{(6)}	60	Autumn Moffat-Korth (17–8)	Marina Vitalich (13-9)
May 4*	3:00 PM	Southern Utah		Kathryn Berg Field • Cedar City, UT	W 9–0 ^{(5)}	100	Arissa Paulson (9–4)	Tyler Denhart (8–12)
May 7*	5:00 PM	Santa Clara		SCU Softball Field • Santa Clara, CA	W 9–0 ^{(6)}	35	Autumn Moffat-Korth (18–8)	Lauren Anderson (2–7)
May 7	7:30 PM	Santa Clara		SCU Softball Field • Santa Clara, CA	W 15–2 ^{(5)}	35	Arissa Paulson (10–4)	Zoe Straughn (2–3)
May 8	2:00 PM	Santa Clara		SCU Softball Field • Santa Clara, CA	W 6–1	40	Autumn Moffat-Korth (19–8)	Liyah Lopez (3–4)
May 10*	2:00 PM	Dixie State		Gail Miller Field • Provo, UT	W 7–1	350	Autumn Moffat-Korth (20–8)	Carissa Burgess (13–13)
May 10*	4:00 PM	Dixie State		Gail Miller Field • Provo, UT	W 8–2	350	Arissa Paulson (11–4)	Ashtyn Bauerle (5–10)
May 11*	4:00 PM	Utah State		Johnson Softball Field • Logan, UT	W 4–0	197	Autumn Moffat-Korth (21–8)	Delaney Hull (3–8)
May 14	5:00 PM	Pacific		Gail Miller Field • Provo, UT	Canceled	Pacific cancelled their season citing health and wellness concerns May 5		
May 14	7:00 PM	Pacific		Gail Miller Field • Provo, UT	Canceled	Pacific cancelled their season citing health and wellness concerns May 5		
May 15	1:00 PM	Pacific		Gail Miller Field • Provo, UT	Canceled	Pacific cancelled their season citing health and wellness concerns May 5		
2021 NCAA Division I softball tournament
May 20*	5:30 PM	#21 Virginia Tech		Alberta B. Farrington Softball Stadium • Tempe, AZ	L 2–5	574	Keely Rochard (26–8)	Autumn Moffat-Korth (21–9)
May 21*	4:30 PM	Southern Illinois		Alberta B. Farrington Softball Stadium • Tempe, AZ	W 7–2	550	Autumn Moffat-Korth (22–9)	Sarah Harness (22–6)
May 21*	8:00 PM	#12 ^{(13)} Arizona State		Alberta B. Farrington Softball Stadium • Tempe, AZ	W 9–8	689	Arissa Paulson (12–4)	Lindsay Lopez (16–7)
May 22*	4:00 PM	#21 Virginia Tech		Alberta B. Farrington Softball Stadium • Tempe, AZ	L 4–11	719	Keely Rochard (28–8)	Autumn Moffat-Korth (22–10)
*Non-Conference Game. All times are in Mountain Time Zone.

== TV and streaming broadcast information ==
- Arizona State: Matt Venezia & Mac Friday (P12+ ASU)
- Arizona State: Ben Pokorny & Mac Friday (P12+ ASU)
- Washington: No commentary (YouTube)
- Seattle: No commentary (FloSoftball)
- Arizona: Danny Martinez (P12+ ARIZ)
- Oregon State: No commentary (P12+ ARIZ)
- Arizona: Danny Martinez (P12+ ARIZ)
- Stanford: Joaquin Wallace (P12+ STAN)
- Stanford: Jenna Becerra (P12+ STAN)
- Texas: Tyler Denning & Erin Miller (LHN)
- Tarleton State: Tyler Denning & Erin Miller (LHN)
- Stanford: Spencer Linton & Gary Sheide (BYUtv.org)
- Boise State DH: Jarom Jordan & Gary Sheide (BYUtv.org)
- Southern Utah: Jarom Jordan & Spencer Linton (BYUtv)
- Baylor: Spencer Linton & Caitlyn Alldredge (BYUtv.org)
- Baylor DH: Spencer Linton & Caitlyn Alldredge (BYUtv.org)
- Utah State: Spencer Linton & Caitlyn Alldredge (BYUtv.org)
- Saint Mary's: No commentary (WCC Net)
- Saint Mary's DH: No commentary (WCC Net)
- Idaho State: Jarom Jordan & Caitlyn Alldredge (BYUtv.org)
- Utah Valley: Spencer Linton & Caitlyn Alldredge (BYUtv.org)
- Southern Utah: Spencer Linton & Caitlyn Alldredge (BYUtv.org)
- Utah: Spencer Linton & Caitlyn Alldredge (BYUtv.org)
- San Diego DH: Spencer Linton & Caitlyn Alldredge (BYUtv.org)
- San Diego: Spencer Linton & Caitlyn Alldredge (BYUtv.org)
- Utah Valley: Ryan Pickens & Josh Kallunki (WAC DN)
- Loyola Marymount: No commentary (YouTube)
- Loyola Marymount DH: No commentary (YouTube)
- Southern Utah: Kylee Young (Pluto TV)
- Santa Clara DH: No commentary (YouTube)
- Santa Clara: No commentary (YouTube)
- Dixie State DH: Spencer Linton & Caitlyn Alldredge (BYUtv.org)
- Utah State: Adam Larson & Aaron (MW Net)
- Virginia Tech: John Schriffen & Jennie Ritter (ESPN3)
- Southern Illinois: John Schriffen & Jennie Ritter (ESPN3)
- Arizona State: John Schriffen & Jennie Ritter (ESPN3)
- Virginia Tech: John Schriffen & Jennie Ritter (ACCN)

== See also ==
- 2020 BYU Cougars football team
- 2020–21 BYU Cougars men's basketball team
- 2020–21 BYU Cougars women's basketball team
- 2020–21 BYU Cougars women's soccer team
- 2020–21 BYU Cougars women's volleyball team
- 2021 BYU Cougars men's volleyball team
- 2021 BYU Cougars baseball team
