= 2020 BYU Cougars softball team =

American college softball season

2020 BYU Cougars softball
- Conference: West Coast Conference
- Record: 14–9 (0–0 WCC)
- Head coach: Gordon Eakin (18th season)
- Assistant coaches: Pete Meredith (7th season); AJ Taulai'i (3rd season)
- Home stadium: Gail Miller Field

2020 West Coast Conference softball standings
	Conf.						Overall
Team	W		L		T	PCT	W		L		T	PCT
BYU ‍‍‍	0	–	0	–	0	–	14	–	8	–	0	.636
Pacific ‍‍‍	0	–	0	–	0	–	15	–	10	–	0	.600
San Diego ‍‍‍	0	–	0	–	0	–	15	–	12	–	0	.556
Loyola Marymount ‍‍‍	0	–	0	–	0	–	12	–	10	–	0	.545
Santa Clara ‍‍‍	0	–	0	–	0	–	8	–	14	–	0	.364
Saint Mary's ‍‍‍	0	–	0	–	0	–	7	–	18	–	1	.288
† – Conference champion y – Invited to the NCAA tournament As of March 13, 2020; Rankings from NFCA

The 2020 BYU Cougars softball team represented Brigham Young University in the 2020 NCAA Division I softball season. Gordon Eakin entered the year as head coach of the Cougars for an 18th consecutive season. 2020 was the seventh season for the Cougars as members of the WCC in softball. The Cougars entered 2020 having won their last 11 conference championships and as the favorites in the WCC. The Cougars never got to play in conference though, as all athletic events were shut down by the school March 12 due to the COVID-19 pandemic.

== 2020 Roster ==
2017 BYU Cougars Roster
Pitchers: 10 Arissa Paulson – junior; 20 Autumn Moffat – junior; 28 Carley Brown – freshman; 77 Reggie Kanagawa – freshman; Catchers: 10 Morgan Bevell – junior; 13 Bridget Fleener – sophomore; 14 Kaylee Erickson – freshman	Infielders: 3 Marissa Chavez – junior; 5 Taylei Williams – junior; 7 Alyssa Podhurcak – sophomore; 8 Emilee Erickson – senior; 10 Arissa Paulson – junior; 16 Brooke Hill – sophomore; 14 Kaylee Erickson – freshman; 17 Erin Miklus – junior; 54 Huntyr Ava – freshman; 55 Martha Epenesa – sophomore; 77 Reggie Kanagawa – freshman	Outfielders: 1 HannahJo Peterson – junior; 2 Rylee Jensen-McFarland – senior; 4 Ally Oyanguren – freshman; 99 Aubrielle Paulson – sophomore

== Schedule ==
Date	Time	Opponent	Rank^{#}	Site	Result	Attendance	Winning Pitcher	Losing Pitcher
Puerto Vallarta College Challenge
February 6*	9:00 AM	George Washington		Nancy Almaraz Stadium • Puerto Vallarta	W 1–0	N/A	Autumn Moffat (1–0)	Faith Weber (0-1)
February 6*	11:30 AM	Nevada		Nancy Almaraz Stadium • Puerto Vallarta	W 6–1	324	Arissa Paulson (1-0)	Blake Craft (0–1)
February 7*	5:00 PM	Oregon		Nancy Almaraz Stadium • Puerto Vallarta	L 1–3	300	Brooke Yanez (2–0)	Carley Brown (0–1)
February 8*	7:30 PM	#2 Oklahoma		Nancy Almaraz Stadium • Puerto Vallarta	L 1–3	340	Giselle Juarez (1–0)	Autumn Moffat (1–1)
Campbell Cartier Tournament
February 13*	7:00 PM	San Diego State		SDSU Softball Stadium • San Diego, CA	W 3–0	244	Arissa Paulson (2-0)	Maggie Balint
February 14*	12:30 PM	Southern Utah		SDSU Softball Stadium • San Diego, CA	W 11–2	111	Carley Brown (1–1)	Kamryn Grover (0–2)
February 14*	3:00 PM	Fullerton		SDSU Softball Stadium • San Diego, CA	L 3–8	152	Dani Martinez (4-0)	Autumn Moffat (1–2)
February 15*	12:30 PM	Fullerton		SDSU Softball Stadium • San Diego, CA	W 11–3	139	Arissa Paulson (3-0)	Dani Martinez (4-1)
February 15*	5:30 PM	San Diego State		SDSU Softball Stadium • San Diego, CA	L 0–3	244	Hannah Johnson (3–1)	Autumn Moffat (1–3)
Mary Nutter Collegiate Classic
February 20*	7:00 PM	UC Riverside		Big League Dreams Complex Yankee Field • Cathedral City, CA	W 5–2	N/A	Autumn Moffat (2–3)	Jacy Boles (0–1)
February 20*	9:00 PM	Notre Dame		Big League Dreams Complex Yankee Field • Cathedral City, CA	L 1–11^{(5)}	N/A	Payton Tidd (2–1)	Arissa Paulson (3-1)
February 21*	4:30 PM	Nebraska		Big League Dreams Complex Yankee Field • Cathedral City, CA	W 4–1	300	Arissa Paulson (4-1)	Olivia Ferrell (2-2)
February 22*	3:30 PM	Mississippi State		Big League Dreams Complex Pawtuckett Field • Cathedral City, CA	W 6–2	222	Autumn Moffat (3–3)	Grace Fagan (4–2)
February 22*	6:00 PM	Bethune-Cookman		Big League Dreams Complex Pawtuckett Field • Cathedral City, CA	W 11–0	300	Arissa Paulson (5–1)	Victoria Guzman (1–5)
Judi Garman Classic
February 27*	7:00 PM	Cal Poly		Anderson Family Field • Fullerton, CA	W 9–1^{(5)}	100	Autumn Moffat (4–3)	Krystyna Allman (6–2)
February 27*	4:00 PM	Illinois		Anderson Family Field • Fullerton, CA	W 7–6	213	Carley Brown (2–1)	Sydney Sickels (3–4)
February 28*	10:30 AM	#25 Texas Tech		Anderson Family Field • Fullerton, CA	W 7–5	200	Autumn Moffat (5–3)	Erin Edmoundson (6–3)
February 28*	1:00 PM	Boise State		Anderson Family Field • Fullerton, CA	L 1–5	300	Micaela Leal (2–2)	Arissa Paulson (5–2)
February 29*	10:30 AM	Cal		Anderson Family Field • Fullerton, CA	W 10–3	400	Autumn Moffat (6–3)	Alexandra Perez (5–5)
Bulldog Classic
March 5*	7:00 PM	#25 Fresno State		Bulldog Diamond • Fresno, CA	L 0–8^{(5)}	1,200	Hailey Dolcini (8–1)	Arissa Paulson (5–3)
March 6*	12:30 PM	UC Davis		Bulldog Diamond • Fresno, CA	L 4–9	N/A	Taylor Fitzgerald (3–1)	Carley Brown (2–2)
March 6*	3:30 PM	North Dakota State		Bulldog Diamond • Fresno, CA	W 1–0	175	Autumn Moffat (7–3)	Lainey Lyle (2–4)
March 7*	3:30 PM	ECU		Bulldog Diamond • Fresno, CA	L 4–10	N/A	Kama Woodall (3–2)	Autumn Moffat (7–4)
T-Town Showdown
March 12*	5:00 PM	Alabama		Rhoads Stadium • Tuscaloosa, AL	Canceled			
March 13*	12:00 PM	Bryant		Rhoads Stadium • Tuscaloosa, AL	Canceled			
March 14*	10:00 AM	Bryant		Rhoads Stadium • Tuscaloosa, AL	Canceled			
March 14*	12:30 PM	Texas		Rhoads Stadium • Tuscaloosa, AL	Canceled			
BYU Invitational
March 19*	5:00 PM	Montana		Gail Miller Field • Provo, UT	Canceled			
March 20*	12:00 PM	Montana		Gail Miller Field • Provo, UT	Canceled			
March 20*	5:00 PM	North Dakota State		Gail Miller Field • Provo, UT	Canceled			
March 21*	1:00 PM	North Dakota State		Gail Miller Field • Provo, UT	Canceled			
Bear Down Fiesta
March 26*	3:30 PM	Mexico		Hillenbrand Stadium • Tucson, AZ	Canceled			
March 26*	6:00 PM	Arizona		Hillenbrand Stadium • Tucson, AZ	Canceled			
March 27*	3:30 PM	New Mexico		Hillenbrand Stadium • Tucson, AZ	Canceled			
March 27*	6:30 PM	Arizona		Hillenbrand Stadium • Tucson, AZ	Canceled			
Regular Season
March 31*	5:00 PM	Utah State		LaRee & LeGrand Johnson Field • Logan, UT	Canceled			
April 3	6:00 PM	Pacific		Bill Simoni Field • Stockton, CA	Canceled			
April 3	8:00 PM	Pacific		Bill Simoni Field • Stockton, CA	Canceled			
April 4	2:00 PM	Pacific		Bill Simoni Field • Stockton, CA	Canceled			
April 10	5:00 PM	Loyola Marymount		Gail Miller Field • Provo, UT	Canceled			
April 10	7:00 PM	Loyola Marymount		Gail Miller Field • Provo, UT	Canceled			
April 11	1:00 PM	Loyola Marymount		Gail Miller Field • Provo, UT	Canceled			
Deseret First Duel
April 14*	6:00 PM	Utah		Dumke Family Softball Stadium • Salt Lake City, UT	Canceled			
Regular Season
April 15*	6:00 PM	Southern Utah		Gail Miller Field • Provo, UT	Canceled			
UCCU Crosstown Clash
April 22*	6:00 PM	Utah Valley		Gail Miller Field • Provo, UT	Canceled			
Regular Season
April 24	5:00 PM	Saint Mary's		Gail Miller Field • Provo, UT	Canceled			
April 24	7:00 PM	Saint Mary's		Gail Miller Field • Provo, UT	Canceled			
April 25	1:00 PM	Saint Mary's		Gail Miller Field • Provo, UT	Canceled			
April 27*	2:00 PM	Stanford		Gail Miller Field • Provo, UT	Canceled			
UCCU Crosstown Clash
April 28*	5:00 PM	Utah Valley		Wolverine Field • Orem, UT	Canceled			
Regular Season
May 1	5:00 PM	Santa Clara		Gail Miller Field • Provo, UT	Canceled			
May 1	7:00 PM	Santa Clara		Gail Miller Field • Provo, UT	Canceled			
May 2	1:00 PM	Santa Clara		Gail Miller Field • Provo, UT	Canceled			
May 5*	6:00 PM	Utah State		Gail Miller Field • Provo, UT	Canceled			
May 8	5:00 PM	San Diego		USD Softball Complex • San Diego, CA	Canceled			
May 9	1:00 PM	San Diego		USD Softball Complex • San Diego, CA	Canceled			
May 9	3:00 PM	San Diego		USD Softball Complex • San Diego, CA	Canceled			
2020 NCAA Division I softball tournament
TBA*	TBA				Canceled			
*Non-Conference Game. All times are in Mountain Time Zone.

== TV, Radio, and Streaming Information ==
- Feb. 6: No commentary (FloSoftball)
- Feb. 6: No commentary (FloSoftball)
- Feb. 7: No commentary (FloSoftball)
- Feb. 8: No commentary (FloSoftball)
- Feb. 13: Nick McGee (MW Net)
- Feb. 20: Stu Paul (FloSoftball)
- Feb. 20: Stu Paul (FloSoftball)
- Feb. 21: Stu Paul (FloSoftball)
- Feb. 22: Nick Gallopoulos (FloSoftball)
- Feb. 22: Nick Gallopoulos (FloSoftball)
- Feb. 27: Dennis Ackerman (FloSoftball)
- Feb. 27: Dennis Ackerman (FloSoftball)
- Feb. 28: Dennis Ackerman (FloSoftball)
- Feb. 28: Dennis Ackerman (FloSoftball)
- Feb. 29: Dennis Ackerman (FloSoftball)
- Mar. 5: Gabe Camarillo (MW Net)
- Mar. 6: Greg Krikorian & Dustin Vartanian (MW Net)
- Mar. 6: Greg Krikorian & Dustin Vartanian (MW Net)
- Mar. 7: Gabe Camarillo & Dustin Vartanian (MW Net)
