= 2015 West Coast Conference baseball tournament =

- Teams: 4
- Format: Double-elimination
- Finals site: Banner Island Ballpark; Stockton, CA
- Champions: Pepperdine (2nd title)
- Winning coach: Steve Rodriguez (2nd title)
- MVP: Brad Anderson (Pepperdine)
- Attendance: 1,168
- Television: TheW.tv (Prelims); ESPNU (Championship)

2015 West Coast Conference baseball standings
	Conf.						Overall
Team	W		L		T	PCT	W		L		T	PCT
San Diego ‍†‍‍	19	–	8	–	0	.704	33	–	22	–	0	.600
Pepperdine ‍‍‡‍^{y}	17	–	10	–	0	.630	30	–	27	–	0	.526
BYU ‍‍‍	16	–	11	–	0	.593	28	–	25	–	0	.528
Loyola Marymount ‍‍‍	16	–	11	–	0	.593	33	–	21	–	1	.609
San Francisco ‍‍‍	15	–	12	–	0	.556	23	–	31	–	0	.426
Gonzaga ‍‍‍	13	–	14	–	0	.481	24	–	28	–	0	.462
Santa Clara ‍‍‍	12	–	15	–	0	.444	26	–	28	–	0	.481
Saint Mary's ‍‍‍	10	–	17	–	0	.370	28	–	27	–	0	.509
Pacific ‍‍‍	10	–	17	–	0	.370	14	–	37	–	0	.275
Portland ‍‍‍	7	–	20	–	0	.259	12	–	42	–	0	.222
† – Conference champion ‡ – Tournament champion y – Invited to the NCAA Division I Baseball Championship; As of May 24, 2015; Rankings from Collegiate Baseball

The 2015 West Coast Conference baseball tournament was held from May 21 through 23, 2015 at Banner Island Ballpark in Stockton, California. Pepperdine won the four team, double-elimination tournament winner for the second year in a row to earn the league's automatic bid to the 2015 NCAA Division I baseball tournament.

== Seeding ==
The top four finishers from the regular season were seeded one through four based on conference winning percentage. The teams then played a double elimination tournament until they reach the championship game. The championship game was winner takes all.

Team	W	L	Pct.	GB	Seed
San Diego	19	8	.704	–	1
Pepperdine	17	10	.630	2	2
BYU	16	11	.593	3	3
Loyola Marymount	16	11	.593	3	4
San Francisco	15	12	.556	4	–
Gonzaga	13	14	.765	6	–
Santa Clara	12	15	.444	7	–
Saint Mary's	10	17	.370	9	–
Pacific	10	17	.370	9	–
Portland	7	20	.259	12	–

Tiebreakers:

- BYU finishes 3rd and gets the 3-seed via head-to-head. BYU won 2 of 3 vs. Loyola Marymount during the regular season.
- Saint Mary's finishes 8th via head-to-head. Saint Mary's won 2 of 3 vs. Pacific during the regular season.

== Results ==
First round
1	San Diego	3
4	Loyola Marymount	21
2	Pepperdine	8
3	BYU	7
Lower round 1
1	San Diego	5
3	BYU	4

Semi-finals
4	Loyola Marymount	4
2	Pepperdine	2
Lower final
1	San Diego	2
2	Pepperdine	4

Finals
4	Loyola Marymount
2	Pepperdine

== Box scores ==
=== #4 Loyola Marymount vs. #1 San Diego ===
Thursday, May 21 3:06 p.m. PDT Broadcasters: Justin Alderson & Frank Cruz (TheW.tv)
Team	1	2	3	4	5	6	7	8	9	R	H	E
#4 Loyola Marymount	6	1	0	0	3	6	0	1	4	21	22	1
#1 San Diego	0	0	0	0	0	0	0	2	1	3	11	2
WP: Colin Welmon (6–6) LP: David Hill (9–4); Home runs: LMU: David Edwards (6); USD: None; Attendance: 789; Notes: Duration: 3:40; Weather: 70 °F (21 °C), overcast, winds 5 mph to lf Officials: Anthony Prater (HP), Timothy Vessey (1B), Ray Leible (2B), Scott Letendre (3B); Boxscore

=== #3 BYU vs. #2 Pepperdine ===
Thursday, May 22 8:05 p.m. PDT Broadcasters: Justin Alderson & Frank Cruz (TheW.tv)
Team	1	2	3	4	5	6	7	8	9	R	H	E
#3 BYU	0	0	1	1	0	1	0	2	2	7	10	1
#2 Pepperdine	0	0	0	0	0	0	0	5	3	8	12	2
WP: Max Gamboa (5–2) LP: Mason Marshall (4–2); Home runs: BYU: Dillon Robinson (5); PEP: Kolten Yamaguchi (3); Attendance: 789; Notes: Duration: 2:55; Weather: 66 °F (19 °C), clear, winds 15 mph to lf Officials: Randy Sutton (HP), Heath Jones (1B), Scott Letendre (2B), Anthony Prater (3B); Boxscore

=== #1 San Diego vs. #3 BYU ===
Friday, May 22 12:05 p.m. PDT Broadcasters: Justin Alderson & Frank Cruz (TheW.tv)
Team	1	2	3	4	5	6	7	8	9	R	H	E
#1 San Diego	0	0	0	0	1	0	0	1	3	5	14	0
#3 BYU	0	0	0	0	1	1	0	1	1	4	9	0
WP: Anthony McIver (3–2) LP: Kolton Mahoney (4–8); Home runs: USD: Kyle Holder (4), Ben Wylly (4), Riley Adams (5); BYU: None; Attendance: 962; Notes: Duration: 3:11; Weather: 68 °F (20 °C), overcast, winds 8 mph to lf Officials: Scott Letendre (HP), Randy Sutton (1B), Heath Jones (2B), Ray Leible (3B); Boxscore

=== #2 Pepperdine vs. #4 Loyola Marymount ===
Friday, May 22 4:35 p.m. PDT Broadcasters: Justin Alderson & Frank Cruz (TheW.tv)
Team	1	2	3	4	5	6	7	8	9	R	H	E
#2 Pepperdine	0	0	0	0	0	0	0	2	0	2	4	0
#4 Loyola Marymount	0	3	1	0	0	0	0	0	X	4	9	0
WP: Trevor Megill (5–4) LP: A. J. Puckett (7–5) Sv: Cory Abbott (1); Home runs: PEP: None; LMU: Sean Watkins (6); Attendance: 962; Notes: Duration: 2:13; Weather: 75 °F (24 °C), partly cloudy, winds 13 mph to lf Officials: Tim Vessey (HP), Tony Prater (1B), Randy Sutton (2B), Heath Jones (3B); Boxscore

=== #1 San Diego vs. #2 Pepperdine ===
Friday, May 22 7:35 p.m. PDT Broadcasters: Justin Alderson & Frank Cruz (TheW.tv)
Team	1	2	3	4	5	6	7	8	9	R	H	E
#1 San Diego	0	0	0	0	0	0	2	0	0	2	7	0
#2 Pepperdine	0	0	4	0	0	0	0	0	X	4	6	0
WP: Ryan Wilson (7–3) LP: Taylor Kaczmarek (1–2) Sv: Max Gamboa (6); Home runs: USD: Aidan Stinnett (2); PEP: Hutton Moyer (13), Brad Anderson (9); Attendance: 962; Notes: Duration: 2:35; Weather: 69 °F (21 °C), clear, winds 13 mph to lf Officials: Ray Leible (HP), Scott Letendre (1B), Tony Prater (2B), Tim Vessey (3B); Boxscore

=== WCC Championship: #2 Pepperdine vs. #4 Loyola Marymount ===
Saturday, May 23 7:04 p.m. PDT Broadcasters: Roxy Bernstein & Wes Clements (ESPNU)
Team	1	2	3	4	5	6	7	8	9	R	H	E
#2 Pepperdine	1	0	0	1	0	0	0	1	1	4	5	2
#4 Loyola Marymount	1	0	0	0	0	0	0	1	0	2	6	0
WP: Chandler Blanchard (3–3) LP: Sean Watkins (4–1) Sv: Max Gamboa (7); Home runs: PEP: Brad Anderson (10), Matt Gelalich (2), Kolten Yamaguci (4); LMU: None; Attendance: 1,752; Notes: Duration: 3:00; Weather: , clear, winds 13 mph to lf Officials: Heath Jones (HP), Ray Leible (1B), Tim Vessey (2B), Randy Sutton (3B); Boxscore

== All-Tournament Team ==
The following players were named to the All-Tournament Team.

Name	School	Pos
Dillon Robinson	BYU	IF
Austin Bailey	USD	IF
Bryson Brigman	USD	IF
David Edwards	LMU	IF
Trevor Megill	LMU	RHP
Colin Welmon	LMU	RHP
Brad Anderson	PEP	IF
Matt Gelalich	PEP	OF
Chandler Blanchard	PEP	RHP
Ryan Wilson	PEP	LHP

=== Most Outstanding Player ===
Brad Anderson was named Tournament Most Outstanding Player. Anderson hit two home runs in the tournament. In the championship game Anderson came to bat 5 times and was walked three times, with his home run in the first inning tying it up at 1. For the tournament Anderson went 3-for-10, a mere .300, but recorded 3 game tying or winning RBI's, both in elimination games.
