= 2023 West Coast Conference baseball tournament =

- Teams: 6
- Format: Double-elimination
- Finals site: Las Vegas Ballpark; Summerlin South, NV
- Television: SCS Pacific; ESPNU

2023 West Coast Conference baseball standings
	Conf.						Overall
Team	W		L		T	PCT	W		L		T	PCT
Loyola Marymount ‍†‍‍	21	–	6	–	0	.778	29	–	22	–	0	.569
Portland ‍‍‍	17	–	10	–	0	.630	29	–	21	–	0	.580
Santa Clara ‍‍‡‍^{y}	17	–	10	–	0	.630	31	–	18	–	0	.633
San Diego ‍‍‍	17	–	10	–	0	.630	24	–	23	–	1	.510
Saint Mary's ‍‍‍	14	–	13	–	0	.519	21	–	26	–	0	.447
Gonzaga ‍‍‍	14	–	13	–	0	.519	18	–	33	–	0	.353
BYU ‍‍‍	13	–	14	–	0	.481	24	–	28	–	0	.462
Pepperdine ‍‍‍	8	–	19	–	0	.296	19	–	30	–	0	.388
San Francisco ‍‍‍	8	–	19	–	0	.296	18	–	29	–	0	.383
Pacific ‍‍‍	6	–	21	–	0	.222	14	–	35	–	0	.286
† – Conference champion ‡ – Tournament champion y – Invited to the NCAA Tournament; As of May 20, 2023; Rankings from D1Baseball

The 2023 West Coast Conference baseball tournament was held from May 24 through 27 at a new venue: Las Vegas Ballpark in Summerlin South, Nevada. It is the first of four baseball tournaments the WCC has scheduled for the venue. The six team tournament winner, the Santa Clara Broncos, earned the league's automatic bid to the 2023 NCAA Division I baseball tournament.

The tournament used the 6-team format adapted in 2022 where 3 plays 6 and 4 plays 5 in first day elimination games.

Additionally this is the final season BYU participated in the WCC as they joined the Big 12 Conference in the 2024 season.

== Seeding ==
The top six finishers from the regular season were seeded one through six based on conference winning percentage. Teams 1 and 2 had a bye into the double elimination bracket while 3 played 6 and 4 played 5 in a single elimination first round.

Team	W	L	Pct.	GB	Seed
Loyola Marymount	21	6	.778	—	1
Portland	17	10	.630	4	2
Santa Clara	17	10	.630	4	3
San Diego	17	10	.630	4	4
Saint Mary's	14	13	.519	7	5
Gonzaga	14	13	.519	7	6
BYU	13	14	.481	8	—
Pepperdine	8	19	.296	13	—
San Francisco	8	19	.296	13	—
Pacific	6	21	.222	15	—

Tiebreakers:

Portland is the #2 seed because they went 2-1 vs. both San Diego and Santa Clara.
Santa Clara is the #3 seed because they went 2-1 vs. San Diego and 1-2 vs. Portland.
San Diego is the #4 seed because they went 1-2 vs. both Portland and Santa Clara.
Saint Mary's is the #5 seed because they went 2-1 vs. Gonzaga.
Gonzaga is the #6 seed because they went 1-2 vs. Saint Mary's.
Pepperdine is the #8 position because they went 2-1 vs. San Francisco.
San Francisco is the #9 position because they went 1-2 vs. Pepperdine.

== Results ==
=== Play-in round ===
Wednesday, May 24
Team	R
#6 Gonzaga	2
#3 Santa Clara	4

Wednesday, May 24
Team	R
#5 Saint Mary's	17
#4 San Diego	8

=== Double-elimination round ===
First round
1	Loyola Marymount	1
5	Saint Mary's	4
2	Portland	3
3	Santa Clara	15
Lower round 1
1	Loyola Marymount	3
2	Portland	15

Semi-finals
5	Saint Mary's	3
3	Santa Clara	17
Lower final
5	Saint Mary's	4
2	Portland	8

Finals
3	Santa Clara	6	—
2	Portland	0	—

== Schedule ==
All matches except Championship 1 were streamed on WCC Network and broadcast on Stadium College Sports Pacific. Championship 1 was televised on ESPNU.

In addition to the TV channels listed, all matches were streamed on WCC Network.

Game	Time*	Matchup^{#}	Television	TV Announcers	Attendance
Wednesday, May 24
1	3:00 p.m.	#3 Santa Clara 4, #6 Gonzaga 2	SCS Pacific	Steve Quis & Bryan Sleik	
2	7:20 p.m.	#4 San Diego 8, #5 Saint Mary's 17	SCS Pacific	Steve Quis & Bryan Sleik	1,292
Thursday, May 25
3	3:00 p.m.	#1 Loyola Marymount 1, #5 Saint Mary's 4	SCS Pacific	Steve Quis & Bryan Sleik	
4	7:20 p.m.	#2 Portland 3, #3 Santa Clara 15	SCS Pacific	Steve Quis & Bryan Sleik	1,259
Friday, May 26
5	12:00 p.m.	#1 Loyola Marymount 3, #2 Portland 15	SCS Pacific	Steve Quis & Bryan Sleik	
6	4:15 p.m.	#3 Santa Clara 17, #5 Saint Mary's 3	SCS Pacific	Steve Quis & Bryan Sleik	
7	9:35 p.m.	#2 Portland 8, #5 Saint Mary's 4	SCS Pacific	Steve Quis & Bryan Sleik	1,255
Championship – Saturday, May 27
8	1:00 p.m.	#3 Santa Clara 6, #2 Portland 3	ESPNU		1184
*Game times in Pacific Time. # – Rankings denote tournament seed.
