= BYU Cougars softball =

- 2025 BYU Cougars softball team
- Founded: 2000
- University: Brigham Young University
- Athletic director: Brian Santiago
- All-time Record: 912-471 (.659)
- Head coach: Gordon Eakin (22nd season)
- Conference: Big 12
- Location: Provo, Utah, US
- Home stadium: Gail Miller Field (capacity: 2,100)
- Nickname: Cougars
- Colors: Blue and white

NCAA Tournament appearances
- 2001, 2005, 2006, 2007, 2008, 2009, 2010, 2011, 2012, 2013, 2014, 2015, 2016, 2017, 2018, 2019, 2021

Conference tournament championships
- Mountain West Conference; 2001, 2005; Western Athletic Conference; 2012

Regular-season conference championships
- Mountain West Conference; 2001, 2005, 2007, 2009, 2010, 2011; Western Athletic Conference; 2012; Pacific Coast Softball Conference; 2013; West Coast Conference; 2014, 2015, 2016, 2017, 2018, 2019, 2021, 2022

The BYU Cougars softball program began its first year in 2000. The current coach is Gordon Eakin who is in his 22nd season coaching the BYU Cougars softball team.

== History ==
The BYU Cougars softball team has been to 15 straight NCAA Tournament appearances and 16 total entering the 2020 season. In 2014 the Cougars became the only team to have won four conference championships from four different conferences in four consecutive years; 2011 Mountain West Conference, 2012 Western Athletic Conference, 2013 Pacific Coast Softball Conference, and 2014 West Coast Conference. The Cougars softball field is the fourth largest on-campus NCAA softball facility.

== Stadium ==
Gail Miller Field is the home of the BYU Cougars softball team. The field is part of the Larry H. Miller Sports Complex and is located directly behind Larry H. Miller Field.

== Results by season ==
Season Results
Year	Coach	Overall Record	Conference Record	Conference Standing	Postseason
(Mountain West Conference) (2000–2011)
2000	Mary Kay Amicone	16–27	7–13	5th	—
2001	Mary Kay Amicone	35–26	11–6	1st	NCAA First Round
2002	Mary Kay Amicone	30–23	6–10	5th	—
2003	Gordon Eakin	36–17	10–7	3rd	—
2004	Gordon Eakin	34–18	11–8	3rd	—
2005	Gordon Eakin	45–14	16–2	1st	NCAA Second Round
2006	Gordon Eakin	43–22	15–5	2nd	NCAA Second Round
2007	Gordon Eakin	43–20	16–4	1st	NCAA Regional
2008	Gordon Eakin	44–20	14–6	2nd	NCAA Regional
2009	Gordon Eakin	40–18	12–2	1st	NCAA Second Round
2010	Gordon Eakin	46–13	12–3	1st	NCAA Regional
2011	Gordon Eakin	40–18	11–2	1st	NCAA Regional
(Western Athletic Conference) (2012)
2012	Gordon Eakin	45–15	15–4	1st	NCAA Regional
(Pacific Coast Softball Conference) (2013)
2013	Gordon Eakin	33–25	19–5	1st	NCAA First Round
(West Coast Conference) (2014–2023)
2014	Gordon Eakin	34–23	12–2	1st	NCAA Second Round
2015	Gordon Eakin	40–14	13–2	1st	NCAA Second Round
2016	Gordon Eakin	36–21	12–3	1st	NCAA Second Round
2017	Gordon Eakin	46–13	14–1	1st	NCAA Regional
2018	Gordon Eakin	36–22	13–1	1st	NCAA Second Round
2019	Gordon Eakin	30–26	12–3	1st	NCAA Second Round
2020	Gordon Eakin	14–9	0–0	—	Canceled due to the COVID-19 pandemic
2021	Gordon Eakin	38–17	11–1	1st	NCAA Regional
2022	Gordon Eakin	42-10	13-2	1st	—
2023	Gordon Eakin	35-17	11-4	2nd	NISC Runner-up
(Big 12 Conference) (2024–present)
2024	Gordon Eakin	31-23	11-16	T-6th	—
Totals 24 Years; 2 Coaches		912-471 (.659)	297-112 (.726)	16 Conf. Championships	17 Postseason Appearances

== Notable players ==
=== Conference awards ===
Big 12 Freshman of the Year

- Ilove’a Brittingham (2025)
