= 2015 BYU Cougars softball team =

American college softball season

2015 BYU Cougars softball

2015 Puerto Vallarta College Challenge Champions 2015 WCC Champions
- Conference: West Coast Conference
- Record: 40–14 (13–2 WCC)
- Head coach: Gordon Eakin (13th season)
- Assistant coaches: Pete Meredith (2nd season); Kristin Delahoussaye (2nd season)
- Home stadium: Gail Miller Field

2015 West Coast Conference softball standings
	Conf.				Overall
Team	W		L	PCT	W		L	PCT
BYU ‍†‍‍^{y}	13	–	2	.867	39	–	12	.765
San Diego ‍‍‍	8	–	7	.533	29	–	23	.558
Loyola Marymount ‍‍‍	8	–	7	.533	26	–	28	.481
Pacific ‍‍‍	7	–	8	.467	19	–	36	.345
Saint Mary's ‍‍‍	5	–	10	.333	21	–	32	.396
Santa Clara ‍‍‍	4	–	11	.267	15	–	35	.300
† – Conference champion y – Invited to the NCAA tournament As of May 10, 2015; Rankings from USA Today/NFCA Coaches

The 2015 BYU Cougars softball team represented Brigham Young University in the 2015 NCAA Division I softball season. Gordon Eakin entered the year as head coach of the Cougars for a 13th consecutive season. 2015 was the second season for the Cougars as members of the WCC in softball. The Cougars entered 2015 having won their last 6 conference championships and as the favorites in the WCC. After sweeping a double header from Santa Clara on May 1, BYU won the 2015 WCC regular season title and became the first team to clinch a spot in the 2015 NCAA Division I softball tournament. The berth would be BYU's eleventh consecutive berth in the NCAA tournament.

BYU played in the Eugene, Oregon softball region where they went 1–2, losing to North Dakota State in the second elimination game. The Cougars finished the season 40–14, 13–2 in conference play. During the process McKenna Bull set a record for number of wins within a season at BYU with 34.

== 2015 roster ==
2015 BYU Cougars Roster
Pitchers: 3 Ashley Thompson – sophomore; 5 McKenna Bull – sophomore; 7 Arianna Paulson – freshman; 22 Madison Merrell – freshman; Catchers: 0 Mercedes O'Connor – sophomore; 4 Sydney Broderick – sophomore; 12 Megan Arnold – senior	Infielders: 3 Ashley Thompson – sophomore; 6 Ashley Godfrey – freshman; 7 Arianna Paulson – freshman; 9 Lauren Bell – sophomore; 10 Karli Lehr – freshman; 12 Megan Arnold – senior; 13 McKenzie St. Clair – sophomore; 16 Alexa Strid – freshman; 18 Caitlyn Larsen – freshman; 22 Madison Merrell – freshman; 25 Coco Tauali'i – junior	Outfielders: 0 Mercedes O'Connor – sophomore; 1 Lacey Hofstedt – senior; 2 Gordy Bravo – junior; 4 Sydney Broderick – sophomore; 13 McKenzie St. Clair – sophomore; 27 Brittany Call – sophomore; 32 Greta Bodine – freshman

== Schedule ==
Date	Time	Opponent	Site	Result	Attendance	Winning Pitcher	Losing Pitcher
Kajikawa Classic
February 5*	4:30 PM	Virginia Cavaliers	Tempe Sports Complex • Tempe, AZ	W 5–4	115	McKenna Bull (1-0)	Alex Formby (0-1)
February 5*	7:00 PM	San Jose State Spartans	Tempe Sports Complex • Tempe, AZ	L 8–9	N/A	Madison Fish (1-0)	Arianna Paulson (0-1)
February 6*	11:30 AM	New Mexico Lobos	Tempe Sports Complex • Tempe, AZ	W 2–0	150	McKenna Bull (2-0)	Tess McPherson (0-1)
February 6*	1:55 PM	Cal Golden Bears	Tempe Sports Complex • Tempe, AZ	L 4–12^{5}	156	Nisa Ontiveros (1-0)	Ashley Thompson (0-1)
February 7*	9:15 AM	Cal Poly Mustangs	Tempe Sports Complex • Tempe, AZ	L 1–3	N/A	Sierra Hyland (2-0)	McKenna Bull (2-1)
Wilson/DeMari Desert Classic
February 12*	4:30 PM	Hawaii Rainbow Wahine	Eller Media Stadium • Las Vegas, NV	W 5-4	246	McKenna Bull (3-1)	Kanani Aina Cabrales (2-1)
February 13*	12:10 PM	Northwestern Wildcats	Eller Media Stadium • Las Vegas, NV	W 5-1	N/A	McKenna Bull (4-1)	Kristen Wood (1-2)
February 13*	5:15 PM	UNLV Rebels	Eller Media Stadium • Las Vegas, NV	W 6–5	416	McKenna Bull (5-1)	Kwyn Cooper (2-2)
February 14*	9:00 AM	UTEP Miners	Eller Media Stadium • Las Vegas, NV	W 9–0^{5}	N/A	McKenna Bull (6-1)	Taylor Grohmann (0-2)
February 14*	11:15 AM	#25 Cal State Fullerton Titans	Eller Media Stadium • Las Vegas, NV	L 0–11^{5}	125	Christina Washington (3-0)	Arianna Paulson (0-2)
Mary Nutter Collegiate Classic
February 19*	1:27 PM	UC Santa Barbara Gauchos	Big League Dreams Complex • Cathedral City, CA	W 16–4	146	McKenna Bull (7-1)	Ashley Ludlow (1-6)
February 19*	7:00 PM	Maryland Terrapins	Big League Dreams Complex • Cathedral City, CA	L 1–2^{9}	102	Kaitlyn Schmeiser (5-4)	McKenna Bull (7-2)
February 20*	10:00 AM	Texas A&M Aggies	Big League Dreams Complex • Cathedral City, CA	L 5–8	N/A	Rachel Fox (5-3)	McKenna Bull (7-3)
February 21*	10:00 AM	Indiana Hoosiers	Big League Dreams Complex • Cathedral City, CA	W 5–3	103	McKenna Bull (8-3)	Lora Olson (1-6)
February 21*	2:45 PM	Oregon State Beavers	Big League Dreams Complex • Cathedral City, CA	W 14–5	230	McKenna Bull (9-3)	Melanie Dembinski (4-1)
Puerto Vallarta College Challenge
February 26*	2:00 PM	Nevada Wolfpack	City Stadium • Puerto Vallarta	W 7–5	156	McKenna Bull (10-3)	Megan Dortch (1-4)
February 27*	9:00 AM	Northern Colorado Bears	City Stadium • Puerto Vallarta	W 5–4	102	McKenna Bull (11-3)	Kelli Kleis (1-2)
February 27*	2:00 PM	Southern Illinois Salukis	City Stadium • Puerto Vallarta	W 8–0	117	McKenna Bull (12-3)	Savanna Dover (1-2)
February 28*	10:00 AM	Southern Illinois Salukis	City Stadium • Puerto Vallarta	W 8–1	163	McKenna Bull (13-3)	Shaye Harre (1-2)
University of Tennessee Tournament
March 5*	12:00 PM	North Dakota State Bison	Lee Softball Stadium • Knoxville, TN	Canceled			
March 6*	9:00 AM	Northern Iowa Panthers	Lee Softball Stadium • Knoxville, TN	Canceled			
March 6*	2:00 PM	Indiana State Sycamores	Lee Softball Stadium • Knoxville, TN	Canceled			
March 7*	2:00 PM	Tennessee Lady Volunteers	Lee Softball Stadium • Knoxville, TN	Canceled			
March 7*	4:30 PM	Purdue Boilermakers	Lee Softball Stadium • Knoxville, TN	Canceled			
San Diego Classic II
March 12*	5:00 PM	Long Beach State 49ers	SDSU Softball Stadium • San Diego, CA	W 2–1	101	McKenna Bull (14-3)	Christina Clermont (4-6)
March 12*	4:45 PM	San Diego State Aztecs	SDSU Softball Stadium • San Diego, CA	W 3–1	232	McKenna Bull (15-3)	Erica Romero (13-6)
March 13*	4:30 PM	#15 Baylor Lady Bears	Sportsplex USA Santee • San Diego, CA	L 1–4	225	Heather Stearns (6-5)	McKenna Bull (15-4)
March 14*	9:00 AM	Western Carolina Catamounts	Sportsplex USA Santee • San Diego, CA	W 3–1	N/A	McKenna Bull (16-4)	Jordan Garrett (5-7)
March 14*	11:28 AM	Connecticut Huskies	Sportsplex USA Santee • San Diego, CA	W 4–1	233	McKenna Bull (17-4)	Chelsea Eckert (0-4)
Regular season
March 20*	4:05 PM	Oklahoma State Cowgirls	Gail Miller Field • Provo, UT	W 2–1	590	McKenna Bull (18-4)	Brandi Needham (9-5)
March 20*	6:20 PM	Oklahoma State Cowgirls	Gail Miller Field • Provo, UT	W 10–2^{5}	590	Ashley Thompson (1-1)	Jessi Haffner (4-1)
March 21*	1:05 PM	Oklahoma State Cowgirls	Gail Miller Field • Provo, UT	W 10–2^{6}	563	Arianna Paulson (1-2)	Brandi Needham (9-6)
March 21*	3:55 PM	Utah Valley Wolverines	Gail Miller Field • Provo, UT	L 0–13^{5}	563	Bailey Moore (8-11)	McKenna Bull (18-5)
March 24*	3:00 PM	Weber State Wildcats	Wildcat Softball Field • Ogden, UT	W 8–0^{5}	375	McKenna Bull (19-5)	Bailey Seek (7-3)
March 31*	4:00 PM	Utah State Aggies	Johnson Softball Field • Logan, UT	W 13–2^{5}	547	McKenna Bull (20-5)	Brina Buttacavoli (1-10)
April 3	3:00 PM	Saint Mary's Gaels	Cottrell Field • Moraga, CA	W 7–3^{10}	101	McKenna Bull (21-5)	Katlyn Whitt (2-4)
April 4	12:00 PM	Saint Mary's Gaels	Cottrell Field • Moraga, CA	W 3–2	121	McKenna Bull (22-5)	Lujane Mussadi (5-14)
April 4	2:15 PM	Saint Mary's Gaels	Cottrell Field • Moraga, CA	W 8–5	151	Ashley Thompson (2-1)	Katlyn Whitt (2-5)
April 7*	2:53 PM	Utah Valley Wolverines	UVU Wolverine Softball Field • Orem, UT	W 9–2	255	Ashley Thompson (3-1)	Bailey Moore (9-15)
April 10	5:00 PM	Pacific Tigers	Gail Miller Field • Provo, UT	W 7–0	681	McKenna Bull (23-5)	Dani Bonnet (5-15)
April 10	7:40 PM	Pacific Tigers	Gail Miller Field • Provo, UT	W 16–9	681	McKenna Bull (24-5)	Cassidy Gustafson (2-8)
April 11	1:00 PM	Pacific Tigers	Gail Miller Field • Provo, UT	W 8–0^{5}	N/A	McKenna Bull (25-5)	Dani Bonnet (5-16)
April 16*	4:00 PM	Southern Utah Thunderbirds	Gail Miller Field • Provo, UT	W 5–1	469	McKenna Bull (26-5)	Katie Greenberg (8-12)
April 16*	6:42 PM	Southern Utah Thunderbirds	Gail Miller Field • Provo, UT	L 8–11	469	Ashley Ostler (3-7)	McKenna Bull (26-6)
April 22*	5:00 PM	Utah State Aggies	Gail Miller Field • Provo, UT	W 8–1	444	McKenna Bull (27-6)	Alleyah Armendariz (1-15)
April 24	5:35 PM	San Diego Toreros	Gail Miller Field • Provo, UT	W 8–0^{5}	200	McKenna Bull (28-6)	Paige von Sprecken (21-9)
April 24/25	9:20 PM/11:00 AM	San Diego Toreros	Gail Miller Field • Provo, UT	W 9–3	200	McKenna Bull (29-6)	Paige von Sprecken (21-10)
April 25	1:00 PM	San Diego Toreros	Gail Miller Field • Provo, UT	W 6–2	200	McKenna Bull (30-6)	Grace Hernandez (6-7)
April 28*	5:30 PM	Weber State Wildcats	Gail Miller Field • Provo, UT	L 2–9	413	Sierra Whitmer (7-2)	McKenna Bull (30-7)
May 1	5:00 PM	Santa Clara Broncos	SCU Softball Field • Santa Clara, CA	W 4–0	N/A	McKenna Bull (31-7)	Ciara Gonzales (12-15)
May 1	7:00 PM	Santa Clara Broncos	SCU Softball Field • Santa Clara, CA	W 5–0	N/A	Ashley Thompson (4-1)	Micaela Vierra (0-3)
May 2	1:00 PM	Santa Clara Broncos	SCU Softball Field • Santa Clara, CA	W 8–5^{5}	N/A	McKenna Bull (32-7)	Briana Rios (1-11)
May 5*	5:00 PM	Utah Valley Wolverines	Gail Miller Field • Provo, UT	W 8–0^{5}	556	McKenna Bull (33-7)	Kailey Christensen (1-10)
May 8	1:00 PM	Loyola Marymount Lions	Smith Field • Los Angeles, CA	L 5–6	133	Rachel Farrington (20-13)	Ashley Thompson (4-2)
May 8	3:00 PM	Loyola Marymount Lions	Smith Field • Los Angeles, CA	L 4–8	142	Stephanie Crist (5-10)	Arianna Paulson (1-3)
May 9	3:00 PM	Loyola Marymount Lions	Smith Field • Los Angeles, CA	W 10–2^{6}	147	McKenna Bull (34-7)	Rachel Farrington (20-14)
2015 NCAA Regionals
May 14*	6:00 PM	#2 Oregon Ducks	Howe Field • Eugene, OR	L 0–8^{6}	1,592	Cheridan Hawkins (28-3)	McKenna Bull (34-8)
May 15*	3:00 PM	Fresno State Bulldogs	Howe Field • Eugene, OR	W 8–7	1,532	Arianna Paulson (2-3)	Taylor Langdon (1-1)
May 15*	6:00 PM	North Dakota State Bison	Howe Field • Eugene, OR	L 0–7	1,532	Krista Menke (34-5)	McKenna Bull (34-9)
*Non-Conference Game. All times are in Mountain Time Zone.

== TV, radio, and streaming information ==
During the 2015 season BYUtv broadcast 13 home games: Mar. 20 (DH) & 21 vs. Oklahoma State, Mar. 21 vs. Utah Valley, Apr. 10 (DH) & 11 vs. Pacific, Apr. 16 (DH) vs. Southern Utah, Apr. 22 vs. Utah State, Apr. 25 vs. San Diego, Apr. 28 vs. Weber State, and May 5 vs. Utah Valley. Spencer Linton acted as the play-by-play man for these games while former Cougar softball coach Vaughn Alvey and former football and baseball player Gary Sheide provided the analysis.

TheW.tv streamed 2 home games: Apr. 24 (DH) vs. San Diego. Robbie Bullough provided play-by-play and Bailey Higgins provided analysis. The second game would be suspended, and TheW.tv was not able to pick up the remainder of the second game on Apr. 25.

BYU Radio would provide a game broadcast for two road games during the season. The Mar. 31 game at Utah State and the Apr. 7 game at Utah Valley would have a radio only broadcast with Robbie Bullough providing the call. BYU Radio would also simulcast 7 BYUtv games.

Road games at UNLV (MW Network), at Weber State (Watch Big Sky), at Utah State (MW Network), at Utah Valley (YouTube), and the first game at Loyola Marymount (The W.tv) would have Internet TV broadcasts available.
