= Klein Family Field =

Baseball stadium in Stockton, California

- Interactive map of Klein Family Field
- Location: 3601 Pacific Ave. Stockton, California, USA
- Coordinates: 37.975786°N 121.315973°W
- Owner: University of the Pacific
- Operator: University of the Pacific
- Capacity: 2,500
- Surface: Natural grass
- Scoreboard: Electronic
- Field size: 317 feet (Left field); 375 feet (LCF); 405 feet (Center field); 365 feet (RCF); 325 feet (Right field)

Construction
- Opened: April 18, 2006

Tenant
- Pacific Tigers baseball (2006–present)

Klein Family Field is a baseball stadium in Stockton, California. It is the home field of the University of the Pacific Tigers college baseball team. The stadium holds 2,500 people and opened in 2006. Prior to the completion of Klein Family Field, the Tigers played home games at Billy Hebert Field in Oak Park, Stockton, California.

== Location history ==
Before the current baseball facility was built, the field's location was home to a football practice facility. Called Zuckerman Field, it was the practice field for the National Football League's San Francisco 49ers, who held training camp at the University of the Pacific from 1998 to 2002.

== See also ==
- List of NCAA Division I baseball venues
