= Frank Cruz =

American college baseball coach

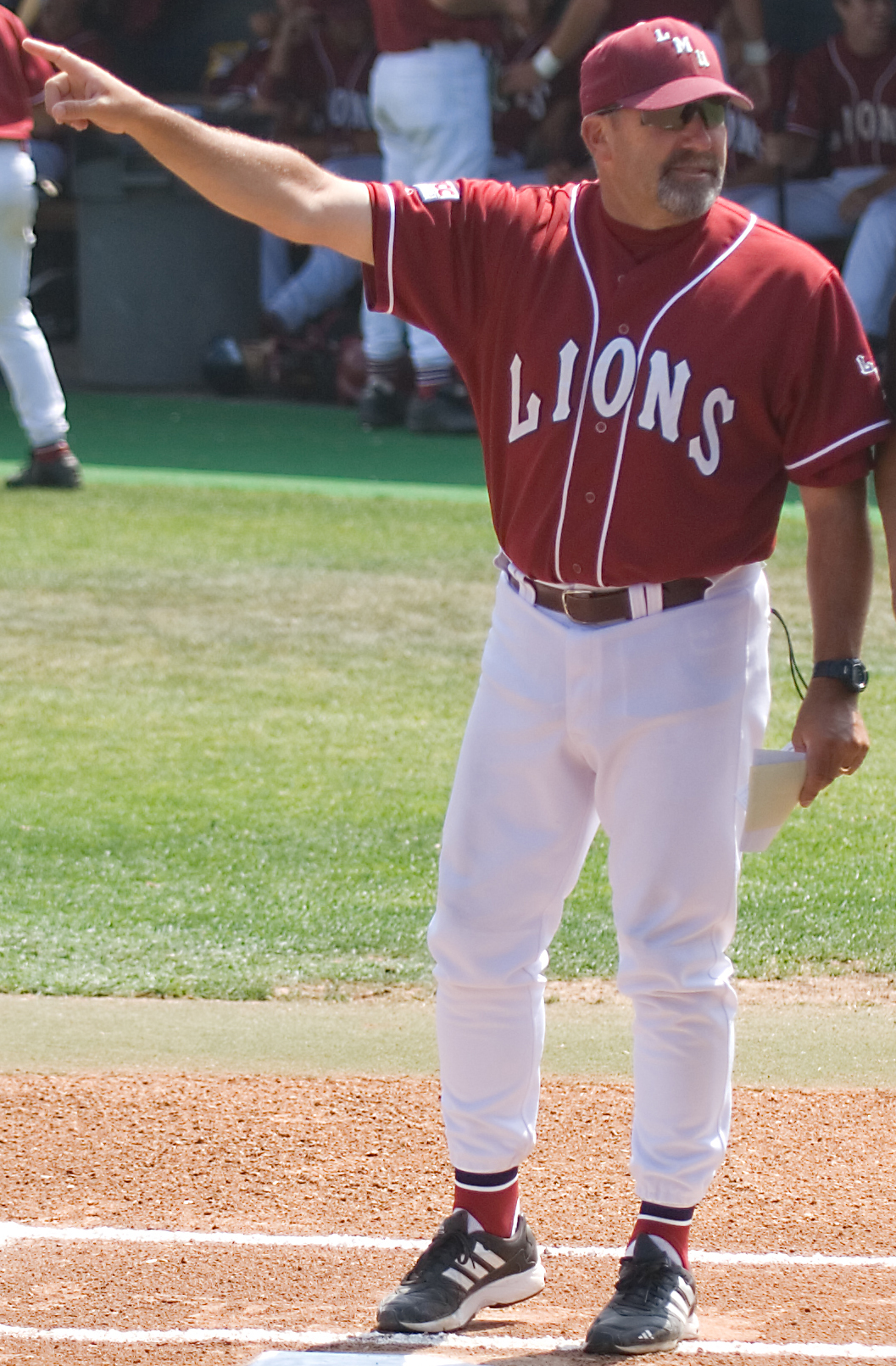
- Cruz with LMU in 2007

Biographical details
- Born: 1959 (age 66–67); Los Angeles, California, U.S.
- Education: Pepperdine (1983)

Coaching career (HC unless noted)
- 1993–1996: USC (assistant)
- 1997–2008: Loyola Marymount
- 2009–2010: USC (assistant)
- 2011–2012: USC

Head coaching record
- Overall: 377–419–3

Accomplishments and honors

Awards
- 3x WCC Coach of the Year (1998, 2000, 2004)

Frank Cruz (born 1959) is an American college baseball coach, who most recently served as the head coach of the USC Trojans baseball team. He held the position from 2011 through 2012. Cruz was relieved of his duties for "knowingly violating NCAA Countable Athletically-Related Activities limitations" just two days prior to the beginning of the 2013 NCAA Division I baseball season.

== Early life ==
A native of Los Angeles, Cruz graduated from Saint Monica Catholic High School of Santa Monica, California in 1977.

== Coaching career ==
Cruz began coaching at University High in Los Angeles, where he also taught health and physical education. His teams claimed a city championship and four league crowns. He then moved to USC, where he was an assistant to Mike Gillespie for four seasons, during which the Trojans appeared in four NCAA tournaments and reached the 1995 College World Series final.

Loyola Marymount named Cruz head coach in 1997, and he led the Lions to three straight first-place finishes in the West Coast Conference from 1998–2000. Cruz coached several conference honorees and was named Recruiter of the Year in 1997 by Collegiate Baseball, in part for his assembling the nation's 16th ranked recruiting class that year. The class included 2000 Major League Baseball draft 16th overall pick Billy Traber.

In addition to his duties at LMU, Cruz was head coach of USA Baseball's 2004 national team, winning the program's first gold medal at the FISU World University Championships. He was also an assistant on the 2000 national team.

Following twelve successful years at LMU, Cruz became a volunteer assistant at USC for the 2009 and 2010 seasons under head coach Chad Kreuter.

Cruz was named interim head coach of the Trojans after the 2010 season, and earned the job permanently on May 19, 2011. He was fired for knowingly exceeding the number of hours of scheduled practices after a weeklong investigation by the USC athletic department.

== Head coaching record ==
The following table records Frank Cruz's record as a collegiate head coach.

Record table
Season	Team	Overall	Conference	Standing	Postseason
Loyola Marymount Lions (West Coast Conference) (1997–2008)
1997	Loyola Marymount	21–39	11–17	6th	
1998	Loyola Marymount	34–23–1	21–8	1st	Regional
1999	Loyola Marymount	33–28	18–12	1st (Coast)	Regional
2000	Loyola Marymount	40–19	22–8	1st (Coast)	Regional
2001	Loyola Marymount	21–37	8–22	4th (Coast)	
2002	Loyola Marymount	22–34	15–15	3rd (West)	
2003	Loyola Marymount	26–30	13–17	3rd (West)	
2004	Loyola Marymount	32–22–1	20–7	1st (Coast)	
2005	Loyola Marymount	31–27	18–12	1st (Coast)	
2006	Loyola Marymount	24–32	11–10	4th	
2007	Loyola Marymount	22–33–1	9–12	T-4th	
2008	Loyola Marymount	23–32	7–14	7th	
Loyola Marymount:		329–356–3	173–154		
USC Trojans (Pac-12 Conference) (2011–2012)
2011	USC	25–31	13–14	7th	
2012	USC	23–32	8–22	10th	
USC:		48–63	21–36		
Total:		377–419–3			
National champion Postseason invitational champion Conference regular season champion Conference regular season and conference tournament champion Division regular season champion Division regular season and conference tournament champion Conference tournament champion
