= Gordon Eakin =

American softball coach

Current position
- Title: Head coach
- Team: BYU
- Conference: Big 12 Conference
- Record: 800–372 (.683)

Biographical details
- Born: 1958 (age 67–68); Sandy, Utah, U.S.
- Education: University of Utah

Coaching career (HC unless noted)

Softball
- 2000–2002: BYU (asst.)
- 2003–present: BYU
- 2009–2010: USA Women's Softball (asst.)

Head coaching record
- Overall: 800–372 (.683)

Gordon R. Eakin (born 1958) is an American college softball coach and the current head coach of the BYU Cougars softball team. Eakin is a graduate of the University of Utah and is a former Minor League Baseball player for the Oakland Athletics. Eakin also serves as the USA National Team Hitting Coach.

== Career ==
Eakin was hired as an assistant coach to Mary Kay Amicone in 2001. After the 2002 season Amicone decided to resign, and Eakin became the coach of BYU Softball. During his span as BYU coach, Eakin has coached the Cougars to 6 consecutive conference titles in four separate leagues. He led BYU to their first super regional appearance in 2008 and has coached 12 All-Americans. Two of Eakin's players have gone on to play professionally. Eakin has won conference coach of the year four times (2009, 2010, 2011, 2013) and has never finished lower than third in the conference. Eakin has guided BYU to top-ten national finishes in slugging percentage six times, home runs per game six times, batting average four times and scoring four times.

== Coaching record ==
Eakin has won 6 straight conference titles, 7 of 8, and 8 of 10 since 2005. He has also won the two conference tournaments that he has had a chance to win since 2005. The MWC last held a conference tournament in 2005, and the PCSC and WCC didn't have conference tournaments.

Record table
Season	Team	Overall	Conference	Standing	Postseason
BYU Cougars (Mountain West Conference) (2003–2011)
2003	BYU	36–17	10–7	3rd	
2004	BYU	34–18	11–8	3rd	
2005	BYU	45–14	16–2	1st	2005 Regionals
2006	BYU	43–22	15–5	2nd	2006 Regionals
2007	BYU	43–20	16–4	1st	2007 Regionals
2008	BYU	44–20	14–6	2nd	2008 Regionals
2009	BYU	40–18	12–2	1st	2009 Regionals
2010	BYU	46–13	12–3	1st	2010 Super Regionals
2011	BYU	40–18	11–2	1st	2011 Regionals
BYU (Western Athletic Conference) (2012)
2012	BYU	45–15	15–4	1st	2012 Regionals
BYU (Pacific Coast Softball Conference) (2013)
2013	BYU	33–25	19–5	1st	2013 Regionals
BYU Cougars (West Coast Conference) (2014–2023)
2014	BYU	34–23	12–2	1st	2014 Regionals
2015	BYU	40–14	13–2	1st	2015 Regionals
2016	BYU	34–18	11–2	1st	2016 Regionals
2017	BYU	46–13	14–1	1st	NCAA Regional
2018	BYU	36–22	13–1	1st	NCAA Regional
2019	BYU	30–26	12–3	1st	NCAA Regional
2020	BYU	14–9	0–0	1st	Season canceled due to COVID-19
2021	BYU	38–17	11–1	1st	NCAA Regional
2022	BYU	42–10	13–2	T-1st	
2023	BYU	35–17	11–4	2nd	
BYU Cougars (Big 12 Conference) (2024–present)
2024	BYU	0–0	0–0		
BYU:		800–372 (.683)	262–67 (.796)		
Total:		800–372 (.683)			
National champion Postseason invitational champion Conference regular season champion Conference regular season and conference tournament champion Division regular season champion Division regular season and conference tournament champion Conference tournament champion

Preceded by Mary Kay Amicone	BYU Cougars Head Softball Coach; 2002-Present	Succeeded by Current
