= Gary Sheide =

American football player (born 1952)

No. 12
- Position: Quarterback

Personal information
- Born: November 6, 1952 (age 74)

Career information
- College: Brigham Young (1974)

Awards and highlights
- Sammy Baugh Trophy (1974); WAC Offensive Player of the Year (1974)

Gary Sheide (born November 6, 1952) is an American former football quarterback for Brigham Young University. He was the first quarterback to come out of LaVell Edwards's BYU "quarterback factory."

Sheide was raised in Antioch, California. Sheide played football, baseball, and basketball for Antioch High School, graduating in 1971. He quarterbacked Diablo Valley College from 1971 to 1972. After leaving Diablo Valley, LaVell Edwards recruited Sheide to become the quarterback for Brigham Young's football team. In 1974, he led the Cougars to the Western Athletic Conference championship, LaVell Edwards' first title. Also that year he was awarded the Sammy Baugh Trophy, given to the year's best passer. He is one of seven Cougars to win the award, more than any other school. Sheide was selected in the third round (64th overall pick) of the 1975 NFL draft by the Cincinnati Bengals but he never played in the National Football League.

As of 2008, Sheide broadcasts baseball games for BYUtv Sports with Dave McCann and Jarom Jordan, softball games with Robbie Bullough and has previously done college football games for KBYU as an analyst. On August 31, 2011, it was revealed that Sheide will be a part of the pre-game and post-game analysis for college football games on BYUtv Sports.

Sheide is married and has five children. He was inducted into the BYU hall of fame in 2011.

== College statistics ==
- 1973: 177/294 for 2,350 yards with 22 TD vs 12 INT
- 1974: 181/300 for 2,174 yards with 23 TD vs 19 INT
