= List of USC Trojans head baseball coaches =

The USC Trojans baseball program is a college baseball team that represents the University of Southern California in the Pac-12 Conference in the National Collegiate Athletic Association. The team has seen 17 individuals hold the head coach position since it started playing organized baseball in the 1889 season. During some years, the Trojans had two head coaches, and others had non-consecutive tenures. The current coach is Jason Gill, who will lead his first season in 2020.

Having served for 45 years, Rod Dedeaux holds the all-time wins mark at 1,332.

== Key ==
General
#	Number of coaches (Note: A running total of the number of head coaches.)
GC	Games coached
†	Elected to the National College Baseball Hall of Fame

Overall
OW	Wins
OL	Losses
OT	Ties
O%	Winning percentage

Conference (Note: The Trojans joined the California Intercollegiate Baseball Association in 1927, having played their earlier seasons as an independent. This conference was essentially a division within the Pacific Coast Conference and its 1960 baseball season successor, the Athletic Association of Western Universities. This conference, through expansion, became the Pacific-8, Pacific-10, and finally the Pac-12 Conference.)
CW	Wins
CL	Losses
CT	Ties
C%	Winning percentage

Postseason (Note: Postseason play involving the NCAA Division I Baseball Championship.)
PA	Total Appearances (Note: Postseason appearances include seasons with NCAA Division I Baseball Championship bids since the tournament began in 1947.)
PW	Total Wins
PL	Total Losses
WA	College World Series appearances (Note: College World Series appearances include seasons with CWS bids since the tournament began in 1947.)
WW	College World Series wins
WL	College World Series losses

Championships
CC	Conference regular season
CT	Conference tournament (Note: Includes conference playoffs, which occurred between divisional champions from 1947–1959, and in multiple formats from 1970–1978 and 1995–1998. CIBA also held a championship series between its division winners in 1943. One-game playoffs for the right to advance to these events are also included in the totals.)

== Coaches ==
List of head baseball coaches showing season(s) coached, overall records, conference records, postseason records, championships and selected awards*Statistics correct as of the end of the 2019 NCAA Division I baseball season
#	Name	Term (Note: Southern California did not sponsor a baseball team in 1890–91, 1895, 1897, 1901 or 1919.)	GC	OW	OL	OT	O%	CW	CL	CT	C%	PA	PW	PL	WA	WW	WL	CCs	CTs	NCs	Awards (Note: National, regional and conference coach of the year awards.)
1	Harvey Holmes	1908	19	17	2	0	.895	—	—	—	—	—	—	—	—	—	—	—	—	0	—
2	Curtiss Bernard	1911	13	10	3	0	.769	—	—	—	—	—	—	—	—	—	—	—	—	0	—
3	Len Burrell	1912	15	6	9	0	.400	—	—	—	—	—	—	—	—	—	—	—	—	0	—
4	George Wheeler	1914, 1923	28	15	13	0	.536	—	—	—	—	—	—	—	—	—	—	—	—	0	—
5	Ralph Glaze	1915	15	5	10	0	.333	—	—	—	—	—	—	—	—	—	—	—	—	0	—
6	Charles Millikan	1916	12	6	5	1	.542	—	—	—	—	—	—	—	—	—	—	—	—	0	—
7	Millikan and Phil Koerner	1917	11	5	6	0	.455	—	—	—	—	—	—	—	—	—	—	—	—	0	—
8	Gus Henderson	1920	14	9	4	1	.679	—	—	—	—	—	—	—	—	—	—	—	—	0	—
9	Henderson and Willis O. Hunter	1921	12	9	3	0	.750	—	—	—	—	—	—	—	—	—	—	—	—	0	—
10	Sam Crawford	1924–1929	108	59	46	3	.560	19	18	0	.514	—	—	—	—	—	—	0	—	0	—
11	Sam Barry	1930–1941	232	168	63	1	.726	123	55	0	.691	—	—	—	—	—	—	5	—	0	—
12	Barry and Dedeaux	1942, 1946–1950	243	110	28	0	.797	67	18	0	.788	2	8	4	2	3	3	5	2	1	—
13	Rod Dedeaux †	1943–1945, 1951–1986	1,768	1,219	540	9	.692	480	267	2	.642	20	100	31	15	58	17	23	12	10	—
14	Mike Gillespie	1987–2006	1,237	763	471	2	.618	327	225	0	.592	15	57	31	4	9	7	5	2	1	Collegiate Baseball COY (1998); ABCA West Region COY (1996, 1998); Pac-10 COY (2002); Pac-10 Southern Division COY (1991, 1995, 1996)
15	Chad Kreuter	2007–2010	228	111	117	0	.487	39	63	0	.382	0	—	—	0	—	—	0	—	0	—
16	Frank Cruz	2011–2012	113	50	63	0	.442	21	36	0	.368	0	—	—	0	—	—	0	—	0	—
17	Dan Hubbs	2013–2019	389	188	200	1	.485	92	116	1	.443	1	2	2	0	—	—	0	—	0	—
18	Jason Gill	2020	First season in 2020																		
