= 2021 USC Trojans baseball team =

American college baseball season

2021 USC Trojans baseball
- Conference: Pac-12 Conference
- Record: 25-26 (13-17 Pac-12)
- Head coach: Jason Gill (2nd season)
- Assistant coaches: Bobby Andrews (2nd season); Ted Silva (2nd season); Gabe Alvarez (11th season)
- Home stadium: Dedeaux Field

2021 Pac-12 Conference baseball standings
| | Conf. | | | | Overall |
| Team | W | | L | PCT | W | | L | PCT |
|---|---|---|---|---|---|---|---|---|
| No. 5 Arizona ‍†‍‍^{y} | 21 | – | 9 | .700 | 45 | – | 18 | .714 |
| No. 10 Oregon ‍‍‍^{y} | 20 | – | 10 | .667 | 39 | – | 16 | .709 |
| No. 7 Stanford ‍‍‍^{y} | 17 | – | 10 | .630 | 39 | – | 17 | .696 |
| No. 21 UCLA ‍‍‍^{y} | 18 | – | 12 | .600 | 37 | – | 20 | .649 |
| Arizona State ‍‍‍^{y} | 16 | – | 14 | .533 | 33 | – | 22 | .600 |
| Oregon State ‍‍‍^{y} | 16 | – | 14 | .533 | 37 | – | 24 | .607 |
| California ‍‍‍ | 15 | – | 15 | .500 | 29 | – | 26 | .527 |
| Washington State ‍‍‍ | 13 | – | 17 | .433 | 26 | – | 23 | .531 |
| USC ‍‍‍ | 13 | – | 17 | .433 | 25 | – | 26 | .490 |
| Utah ‍‍‍ | 7 | – | 23 | .233 | 17 | – | 33 | .340 |
| Washington ‍‍‍ | 6 | – | 21 | .222 | 20 | – | 30 | .400 |
† – Conference champion y – Invited to the NCAA tournament As of June 23, 2021; Rankings from D1Baseball

The 2021 USC Trojans baseball team represented the University of Southern California during the 2021 NCAA Division I baseball season. The Trojans played their home games for the 47th season at Dedeaux Field. The team was coached by Jason Gill in his 2nd season at USC.

== Previous season ==
The Trojans began the 2020 season 10-5, good for a tie for third-place in the Pac-12 prior to the NCAA's decision to cancel the season on March 12 due to the COVID-19 pandemic. Due to the season's cancellation, all Division I college baseball players were granted an extra year of eligibility.

== Personnel ==
=== Roster ===
2021 USC Trojans roster
| 2021 USC Roster: 2 - Tyler Lozano - Catcher/Infielder - R-Sophomore; 3 - Jamal O'Guinn - Infielder/Outfielder - R-Junior; 4 - Johnny Olmstead - Infielder - R-Freshman; 5 - Miko Rodriquez - Outfielder - R-Freshman; 6 - D'Andre Smith - Infielder - Freshman; 8 - Ben Ramirez - Infielder - R-Junior; 9 - Carson Wells - Outfielder - Freshman; 10 - Tyler Pritchard - Infielder - R-Senior; 11 - Carson Lambert - Pitcher - R-Sophomore; 13 - Tyresse Turner - Infielder/Outfielder - R-Freshman; 14 - Gus Culpo - Pitcher - R-Senior; 15 - Rhylan Thomas - Outfielder - R-Freshman; 17 - Riley Lamb - Pitcher/Catcher - R-Junior; 18 - Nate Clow - Pitcher/Infielder - Freshman; 20 - Ethan Hoopingarner - Pitcher - R-Freshman; 21 - Adrian Colon-Rosado - Outfielder - R-Freshman; 22 - Clay Owens - Catcher/First Baseman - R-Sophomore; 23 - Brady Shockey - Outfielder - R-Senior; 24 - Ethan Reed - Pitcher - R-Freshman; 25 - John Thomas - Infielder/Outfielder - R-Senior; 26 - Patrick Hubbs - Pitcher - R-Sophomore; 27 - Emilio Rosas - Infielder - R-Sophomore; 28 - Tyler Stromsborg - Pitcher - Freshman; 29 - Isaac Esqueda - Pitcher - R-Junior; 30 - Alex Cornwell - Pitcher - R-Senior; 31 - Connor Cirillo - Infielder - R-Freshman; 32 - Alex Rodriquez - Infielder - Freshman; 33 - Garret Guillemette - Catcher - Freshman; 34 - Taylor Johnson - Catcher - R-Freshman; 35 - Charles Ackers - Pitcher - R-Freshman; 36 - Bart West - Outfielder - R-Junior; 37 - Brian Gursky - Pitcher - R-Junior; 38 - Toby Spach - Pitcher - R-Sophomore; 39 - Jason Starrels - Pitcher - R-Junior; 41 - Ethan Firestone - Catcher - Freshman; 43 - Kyle Wisch - Pitcher - R-Freshman; 44 - Malikai Wickley - Infielder - Freshman; 45 - Jaden Agassi - Pitcher/Third Baseman - Freshman; 49 - Garrett Clarke - Pitcher - R-Sophomore; 50 - Trevor Halsema - Outfielder - R-Junior; 51 - Quentin Longrie - Pitcher - R-Senior; 52 - Jeriah Lewis - Infielder/Outfielder - Freshman; 53 - Joey Bell - Outfielder - Freshman; 54 - Charlie Hurley - Pitcher - Freshman; 55 - Chandler Champlain - Pitcher - R-Sophomore |

=== Coaches ===
2021 USC Trojans baseball coaching staff
- Jason Gill - Head coach
- Gabe Alvarez - Assistant coach
- Ted Silva - Assistant coach
- Bobby Andrews - Volunteer assistant coach

== Schedule and results ==
Legend
| | USC win |
| | USC loss |
| | Postponement |
| **Bold** | USC team member |
| * | Non-Conference game |
| † | Make-Up Game |

2021 USC Trojans baseball game log
Regular season
| Date | Opponent | Time | Site/Stadium | Score | Win | Loss | Save | Overall Record | Pac-12 |
|---|---|---|---|---|---|---|---|---|---|
| Feb 19th | vs Loyola Marymount | 5:00 P.M. | Dedeaux Field • Los Angeles, CA | **W 3-2** | **Nate Clow (1-0)** | Alex Burge (0-1) | None | 1-0 | |
| Feb 20th | vs Loyola Marymount | 2:00 P.M | Dedeaux Field • Los Angeles, CA | **W 5-0** | **Chandler Champlain (1-0)** | Jimmy Galicia (0-1) | **Brian Gursky (1)** | 2-0 | |
| Feb 21st | at Loyola Marymount | 1:00 P.M. | Page Stadium • Los Angeles, CA | L 9-8 (11) | Owen Hackman (1-0) | **Jason Starrels (0-1)** | None | 2-1 | |
| Feb 26th | vs Cal Poly | 5:00 P.M. | Dedeaux Field • Los Angeles, CA | L 2-1 | Andrew Alvarez (1-0) | **Jaden Agassi (0-1)** | None | 2-2 | |
| Feb 27th | vs Cal Poly | 2:00 P.M. | Dedeaux Field • Los Angeles, CA | L 9-4 | Derek True (1-1) | **Kyle Wisch (0-1)** | None | 2-3 | |
| Feb 28th | vs Cal Poly | 1:00 P.M. | Dedeaux Field • Los Angeles, CA | **W 7-6** | **Alex Cornwell (1-0)** | Bryan Woo (0-2) | **Nate Clow (1)** | 3-3 | |
| Mar 5th | vs Call State Fullerton | 5:00 P.M. | Dedeaux Field • Los Angeles, CA | L 5-0 | Tanner Bibee (2-1) | **Isaac Esqueda (0-1)** | None | 3-4 | |
| Mar 6th | vs Pepperdine | 2:00 P.M. | Dedeaux Field • Los Angeles, CA | L 11-5 | Gunner Groen (1-0) | **Chandler Champlain (1-1)** | Nathan Diamond (1) | 3-5 | |
| Mar 7th | at UCLA | 1:00 P.M. | Jackie Robinson Stadium • Los Angeles, CA | L 10-1 | Nick Nastrini (2-0) | **Alex Cornwell (1-1)** | Jake Saum (1) | 3-6 | |
| Mar 9th | at Pepperdine | - | Eddy D. Field Stadium • Malibu, CA | Cancelled | - | - | - | - | - |
| Mar 12th | vs Nevada | 5:00 P.M. | Dedeaux Field • Los Angeles, CA | **W 3-1** | **Isaac Esqueda (1-1)** | Jake Jackson (1-1) | **Nate Clow (2)** | 4-6 | |
| Mar 13th | vs Nevada | 2:00 P.M. | Dedeaux Field • Los Angeles, CA | **W 5-4** | **Brian Gursky (1-0)** | Shane Gustafson (0-1) | None' | 5-6 | |
| Mar 14th | vs Nevada | 1:00 P.M. | Dedeaux Field • Los Angeles, CA | **W 7-2** | **Alex Cornwell (2-1)** | Cam Walty (0-2) | None | 6-6 | |
| Mar 19th | at Washington | 1:00 P.M. | Husky Ballpark • Seattle, WA | **W 3-2** | **Isaac Esqueda (2-1)** | Adam Bloebaum (0-3) | **Ethan Hoopingarner (1)** | 7-6 | 1-0 |
| Mar 20th | at Washington | 5:00 P.M. | Husky Ballpark • Seattle, WA | **W 7-5** | **Garrett Clarke (1-0)** | Colton Charnholm (1-1) | **Jaden Agassi (1)** | 8-6 | 2-0 |
| Mar 21st | at Washington | 1:00 P.M. | Husky Ballpark • Seattle, WA | **W 11-3** | **Alex Cornwell (3-1)** | David Rhodes (0-1) | None | 9-6 | 3-0 |
| Mar 23rd | vs San Diego | 6:00 P.M. | Dedeaux Field • Los Angeles, CA | L 6-5 | Carter Rustad (1-0) | **Charlie Hurley (0-1)** | None | 9-7 | |
| Mar 26th | vs UCLA | 7:05 P.M. | Dedeaux Field • Los Angeles, CA | **W 5-4** | **Garrett Clarke (2-0)** | Sean Mullen (4-1) | None | 10-7 | 4-0 |
| Mar 27th | vs UCLA | 6:05 P.M. | Dedeaux Field • Los Angeles, CA | L 6-3 | Jake Saum (2-2) | **Chandler Champlain (1-2)** | Max Rajcic (1) | 10-8 | 4-1 |
| Mar 28th | vs UCLA | 4:00 P.M. | Dedeaux Field • Los Angeles, CA | L 13-1 | Jared Karros (2-1) | **Alex Cornwell (3-2)** | None | 10-9 | 4-2 |
| Mar 30th | at Loyola Marymount | 6:00 P.M | Page Stadium • Los Angeles, CA | **W 4-3** | **Jaden Agassi** | Mason Kokodynski (0-1) | **Ethan Hoopingarner (2)** | 11-9 | |
| Apr 1st | at California | 6:05 P.M. | Evans Diamond • Berkeley, CA | **W 6-1** | **Isaac Esqueda (3-1)** | Aaron Roberts (1-1) | None | 12-9 | 5-2 |
| Apr 2nd | at California | 3:05 P.M. | Evans Diamond •Berkeley, CA | L 4-3 | Joseph King (1-0) | **Charlie Hurley (0-2)** | None | 12-10 | 5-3 |
| Apr 3rd | at California | 1:05 P.M. | Evans Diamond • Berkeley, CA | L 5-1 | P. Pasqualotto (3-3) | **Alex Cornwell (3-3)** | None | 12-11 | 5-4 |
| Apr 9th | at San Diego | - | Fowler Park • San Diego, CA | Cancelled | - | - | - | - | - |
| Apr 9th | vs Dixie State | 6:00 P.M. | Dedeaux Field • Los Angeles, CA | **W 14-1** | **Isaac Esqueda (4-1)** | Jimmy Borzone (1-4) | None | 13-11 | |
| Apr 10th | vs Dixie State | 2;00 P.M. | Dedeaux Field • Los Angeles, CA | **W 10-3** | **Chandler Champlain (2-2)** | Ryan Hardman (0-4) | None | 14-11 | |
| Apr 11th | vs Dixie State | 1:00 P.M. | Dedeaux Field • Los Angeles, CA | **W 6-5** | **Alex Cornwell (4-3)** | Jack Gonzalez (1-3) | **Garrett Clarke (1)** | 15-11 | |
| Apr 13th | vs Fresno State | 6:00 P.M. | Dedeaux Field • Los Angeles, CA | **W 2-1** | **Toby Spach (1-0)** | Oscar Carvajal (1-3) | **Nate Clow (3)** | 16-11 | |
| Apr 14th | vs Oregon | 6:00 P.M. | Dedeaux Field • Los Angeles, CA | **W 9-5** | **Garrett Clarke (3-0)** | Robert Ahlstrom (2-3) | **Quentin Longrie (1)** | 17-11 | 6-4 |
| Apr 15th | vs Oregon | 2:00 P.M. | Dedeaux Field • Los Angeles, CA | L 13-4 | Caleb Sloan (1-1) | **Chandler Champlain (2-3)** | None | 17-12 | 6-5 |
| Apr 16th | vs Oregon | 1:00 P.M. | Dedeaux Field • Los Angeles, CA | L 7-5 | Andrew Mosiello (3-1) | **Ethan Hoopingarner (0-1)** | Kolby Somers (6) | 17-13 | 6-6 |
| Apr 20th | vs Loyola Marymount | 6:00 P.M. | Dedeaux Field • Los Angeles, CA | **W 8-1** | **Patrick Hubbs (1-0)** | Owen Hackman (1-3) | None | 17-14 | |
| Apr 23rd | at Arizona | 6:05 P.M. | Hi Corbett Field • Tucson, AZ | L 8-5 | Chase Silseth (6-1) | **Isaac Esqueda (4-2)** | Quinn Flanagan (4) | 17-15 | 6-7 |
| Apr 24th | at Arizona | 6:05 P.M. | Hi Corbett Field • Tucson, AZ | L 10-6 | Chandler Murphy (5-0) | **Brian Gursky (1-1)** | None | 17-16 | 6-8 |
| Apr 25th | at Arizona | 1:02 P.M. | Hi Corbett Field • Tucson, AZ | L 8-4 | Chandler Murphy (6-0) | **Alex Cornwell (4-4)** | Vince Vannelle (6) | 17-17 | 6-9 |
| Apr 27th | vs Pepperdine | 6:00 P.M. | Dedeaux Field • Los Angeles, CA | L 5-2 | Tyler Murrah (1-0) | **Brian Gursky (1-2)** | Dylan Schwartz (1) | 17-18 | |
| Apr 30th | vs Stanford | 6:00 P.M. | Dedeaux Field • Los Angeles, CA | L 5-2 (10) | Jacob Palisch (1-0) | **Garrett Clarke (3-1)** | Zach Grech (12) | 17-19 | 6-10 |
| May 1 | vs Stanford | 2:00 P.M. | Dedeaux Field • Los Angeles, CA | L 3-2 | Quinn mathews (4-0) | **Chandler Champlain (2-4)** | Zach Grech (13) | 17-20 | 6-11 |
| May 2 | vs Stanford | 1:00 P.M. | Dedeaux Field • Los Angeles, CA | **W 2-1** | **Alex Cornwell (5-4)** | Brandt Pancer (4-2) | **Nate Clow (4)** | 18-20 | 7-11 |
| May 7 | at Oregon State | 4:05 P.M. | Gross Stadium • Corvallis, OR | L 5-4 | Chase Watkins (2-2) | **Quentin Longrie (0-1)** | Jake Mulholland (12) | 18-21 | 7-12 |
| May 8 | at Oregon State | 6:35 P.M. | Gross Stadium • Corvallis, OR | L 9-7 | Will Frisch (3-0) | **Garrett Clarke (3-2)** | Joey Mundt (2) | 18-22 | 7-13 |
| May 9 | at Oregon State | 12:05 P.M. | Gross Stadium • Corvallis, OR | **W 5-3** | **Toby Spach (2-0)** | Chase Watkins (2-3) | None | 19-22 | 8-13 |
| May 14 | vs Washington State | 6:00 P.M. | Dedeaux Field • Los Angeles, CA | **W 8-6** | **Isaac Esqueda (5-2)** | Brandon White (5-4) | None | 20-22 | 9-13 |
| May 15 | vs Washington State | 2:00 P.M. | Dedeaux Field • Los Angeles, CA | **W 3-2** | **Chandler Champlain (3-4)** | Zane Mills (5-4) | **Nate Clow (5)** | 21-22 | 10-13 |
| May 16 | vs Washington State | 12:00 P.M. | Dedeaux Field • Los Angeles, CA | L 13-2 | Taylor Grant (2-0) | **Alex Cornwell (5-5)** | None | 21-23 | 10-14 |
| May 18 | at Fresno State | 5:00 P.M. | Pete Beiden Field • Fresno, CA | L 13-10 | Ixan Henderson (1-1) | **Nate Clow (1-1)** | None | 21-24 | |
| May 21 | vs Arizona State | 6:00 P.M. | Dedeaux Field • Los Angeles, CA | L 6-2 | Tyler Thornton (2-3) | **Isaac Esqueda (5-3)** | None | 21-25 | 10-15 |
| May 22 | vs Arizona State | 3:00 P.M. | Dedeaux Field • Los Angeles, CA | **W 6-1** | **Chandler Champlain (4-4)** | Justin Fall (7-2) | **Nate Clow (6)** | 21-26 | 11-15 |
| May 23 | vs Arizona State | 12:00 P.M. | Dedeaux Field • Los Angeles, CA | L 10-7 | Kai Murphy (2-1) | **Alex Cornwell (5-6)** | None | 21-27 | 11-16 |
| May 27 | at Utah | 6:00 P.M. | Lindquist Field • Ogden, UT | **W 7-3** | **Isaac Esqueda (6-3)** | Justin Kelly (1-10) | **Garrett Clarke (2)** | 21-27 | 12-16 |
| May 28 | at Utah | 6:00 P.M. | Lindquist Field • Ogden, UT | L 2-1 | Brayson Hurdsman (3-2) | **Charlie Hurley (0-3)** | Matthew Sox (1) | 21-28 | 12-17 |
| May 29 | at Utah | 11:00 A.M. | Lindquist Field • Ogden, UT | **W 17-11** | **Toby Spach (3-0)** | Matthew Sox (5-2) | None | 22-28 | 13-17 |

== Rankings ==
Ranking movements
| | Week | | | | | | | | | | | | | | | | | | | |
| Poll | Pre | 1 | 2 | 3 | 4 | 5 | 6 | 7 | 8 | 9 | 10 | 11 | 12 | 13 | 14 | 15 | 16 | 17 | 18 | Final |
|---|---|---|---|---|---|---|---|---|---|---|---|---|---|---|---|---|---|---|---|---|
| Coaches' | | * | | | | | | | | | | | | | | | | | | |
| Baseball America | | | | | | | | | | | | | | | | | | | | |
| NCBWA† | | | | | | | | | | | | | | | | | | | | |

† NCBWA ranks 30 teams in their preseason poll, but only ranks 25 teams weekly during the season.
* A new poll was not released for this week, so for comparison purposes, the previous week's ranking is inserted in this week's slot.

== 2021 MLB draft ==
| Player | Position | Round | Overall | MLB team |
|---|---|---|---|---|
| Chandler Champlain | RHP | 9 | 273 | New York Yankees |
| Ben Ramirez | INF | 13 | 384 | Seattle Mariners |
| Alex Cornwell | LHP | 15 | 451 | St. Louis Cardinals |
