= Jason Gill =

American college baseball coach and former player

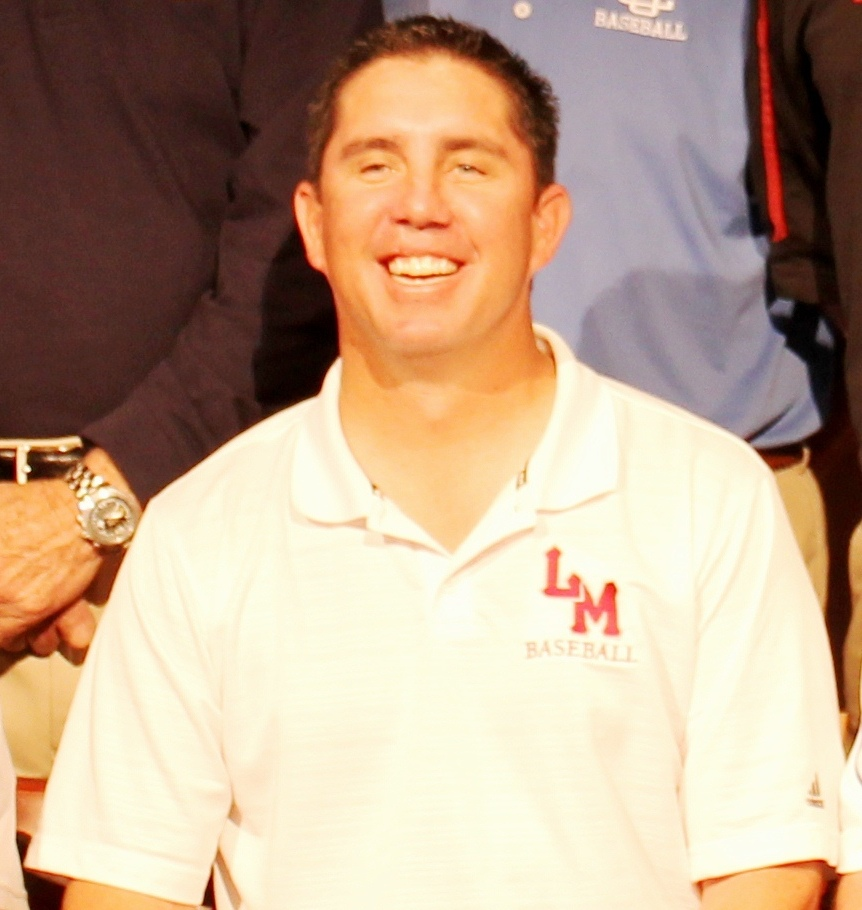
- Gill in 2011

Biographical details
- Born: April 7, 1970 (age 55); Santa Ana, California, U.S.

Playing career
- 1991–1992: Cuesta College
- 1993: Cal State Dominguez Hills
- 1994: Cal State Fullerton
- Position: Shortstop / third baseman

Coaching career (HC unless noted)
- 1995–1996: Cal State Fullerton (GA)
- 1997–1998: Nevada (asst.)
- 1999–2000: Loyola Marymount (asst.)
- 2001–2004: UC Irvine (asst.)
- 2005–2007: Cal State Fullerton (asst.)
- 2008: Oregon (asst.)
- 2009–2019: Loyola Marymount
- 2020–2022: USC

Head coaching record
- Overall: 382–344–1
- Tournaments: West Coast: 9–9; NCAA: 2–2

Accomplishments and honors

Championships
- West Coast regular season (2017); West Coast tournament (2019)

Jason Gill (born April 7, 1970) is an American college baseball coach and former shortstop and third baseman. He played college baseball for Cuesta College, Cal State Dominguez Hills and Cal State Fullerton from 1991 to 1994. He then served as the head coach of the Loyola Marymount Lions (2009–2019) and the USC Trojans (2019–2022).

== Playing career ==
Gill attended Mater Dei High School in Santa Ana, California. He then accepted a scholarship to play at Cuesta College, to play college baseball. He was named an honorable mention All-Western State Conference. After two seasons at Cuesta, Gill then went on to play at Cal State Dominguez Hills. While at Dominguez Hills, Gill was named an honorable mention All-California Collegiate Athletic Association. Gill then moved on to Cal State Fullerton to play his senior season. He batted .345 with .469 on base percentage and slugged .388. He was named a Second Team All-West Coast Conference performer.

== Coaching career ==
Gill then served as a graduate assistant at Fullerton for two seasons while completing his degree. Gill then spent two season as an assistant coach for the Nevada Wolf Pack baseball team. He then accepted a role as an assistant for the Loyola Marymount Lions baseball program. Gill then spent three seasons as an assistant for the UC Irvine Anteaters baseball team. He then returned to Cal State Fullerton as an assistant for three seasons.

On August 13, 2008, Gill was named the head coach of the Loyola Marymount program. In 2011, Gill was interviewed for the head coaching position at Cal State Fullerton, but remained with the Lions.

On June 14, 2019, Gill was hired to be the new head coach of the USC Trojans baseball program. On June 6, 2022, Gill and Trojans agreed to mutually part ways.

== Head coaching record ==
Statistics overview
| Season | Team | Overall | Conference | Standing | Postseason |
|---|---|---|---|---|---|
Loyola Marymount Lions (West Coast Conference) (2009–2019)
| 2009 | Loyola Marymount | 30–29 | 13–8 | 2nd | West Coast Championship Series |
| 2010 | Loyola Marymount | 23–33 | 5–16 | 8th | |
| 2011 | Loyola Marymount | 30–25 | 11–10 | 3rd | |
| 2012 | Loyola Marymount | 27–27 | 14–10 | T-3rd | |
| 2013 | Loyola Marymount | 24–27 | 12–12 | 6th | |
| 2014 | Loyola Marymount | 32–24 | 17–10 | T-2nd | West Coast tournament |
| 2015 | Loyola Marymount | 33–21–1 | 16–11 | T-3rd | West Coast tournament |
| 2016 | Loyola Marymount | 26–27 | 13–14 | T-5th | |
| 2017 | Loyola Marymount | 38–18 | 20–7 | T-1st | West Coast tournament |
| 2018 | Loyola Marymount | 25–30 | 15–12 | 4th | West Coast tournament |
| 2019 | Loyola Marymount | 34–25 | 15–12 | T-4th | NCAA Regional |
| Loyola Marymount: | | 322–285–1 | 151–122–1 | | |
USC Trojans (Pac-12 Conference) (2020–2022)
| 2020 | USC | 10–5 | 0–0 | T-3rd | Season canceled due to COVID-19 |
| 2021 | USC | 25–26 | 13–17 | T-8th | |
| 2022 | USC | 25–28 | 8–22 | 11th | |
| USC: | | 60–59 | 21–39 | | |
| Total: | | 382–344–1 | | | |
National champion Postseason invitational champion Conference regular season champion Conference regular season and conference tournament champion Division regular season champion Division regular season and conference tournament champion Conference tournament champion
