= 2017 BYU Cougars baseball team =

American college baseball season

2017 BYU Cougars baseball

2017 WCC Tri-Regular season Champions 2017 WCC Tournament champions
- Conference: West Coast Conference
- Record: 38–21 (20–7 WCC)
- Head coach: Mike Littlewood (5th season)
- Assistant coaches: Trent Pratt (5th season); Brent Haring (5th season); Jeremy Thomas (5th season)
- Home stadium: Larry H. Miller Field

2017 West Coast Conference baseball standings
| | Conf. | | | | | | Overall |
| Team | W | | L | | T | PCT | W | | L | | T | PCT |
|---|---|---|---|---|---|---|---|---|---|---|---|---|
| Gonzaga ‍†‍‍ | 20 | – | 7 | – | 0 | .741 | 33 | – | 20 | – | 0 | .623 |
| BYU ‍†‍‡‍^{y} | 20 | – | 7 | – | 0 | .741 | 38 | – | 21 | – | 0 | .644 |
| Loyola Marymount ^{†} ‍‍‍ | 20 | – | 7 | – | 0 | .741 | 38 | – | 18 | – | 0 | .679 |
| Saint Mary's ‍‍‍ | 18 | – | 9 | – | 0 | .667 | 37 | – | 20 | – | 0 | .649 |
| San Diego ‍‍‍ | 18 | – | 9 | – | 0 | .667 | 35 | – | 18 | – | 1 | .657 |
| San Francisco ‍‍‍ | 11 | – | 16 | – | 0 | .407 | 29 | – | 28 | – | 0 | .509 |
| Santa Clara ‍‍‍ | 9 | – | 18 | – | 0 | .333 | 13 | – | 40 | – | 0 | .245 |
| Pepperdine ‍‍‍ | 8 | – | 19 | – | 0 | .296 | 20 | – | 32 | – | 0 | .385 |
| Pacific ‍‍‍ | 6 | – | 21 | – | 0 | .222 | 18 | – | 35 | – | 0 | .340 |
| Portland ‍‍‍ | 5 | – | 22 | – | 0 | .185 | 10 | – | 41 | – | 1 | .202 |
† – Conference champion ‡ – Tournament champion y – Invited to the NCAA tournament Rankings from Collegiate Baseball

The 2017 BYU Cougars baseball team represented Brigham Young University in the 2017 NCAA Division I baseball season. Mike Littlewood acted in his fifth season as head coach of the Cougars. BYU was picked to finish fourth in the WCC Pre-season rankings. The Cougars overcame expectations to claim a tri-team championship in the regular season. Afterwards, the Cougars won the West Coast Conference tournament for the first time in their history, claiming the conferences automatic bid to the NCAA tournament, the Cougars first tournament berth since 2002. The Cougars were placed in the Stanford Regional, where they went 1–2. The Cougars finished the season 38–21.

== 2017 roster ==
2017 BYU Cougars roster
| Pitchers: 5 Jackson Bishop – Freshman; 8 Keaton Cenatiempo – Senior; 9 Mason Marshall – Senior; 13 Aaron Cross – Junior; 18 Brady Corless – Senior; 23 Hayden Rodgers – Junior; 26 Riley Gates – Junior; 28 Rhett Parkinson – Junior; 29 Shep Shephard – Freshman; 32 Maverik Buffo – Junior; 34 Jordan Wood – Sophomore; 36 Matt Favero – Freshman; 38 Connor Williams – Junior; 41 Kendall Motes – Junior; 42 Bo Burrup – Sophomore; xx Kenny Saenz – Junior | Infielders: 2 Noah Hill – Sophomore; 3 Brennon Anderson – Junior; 4 Cam Richins – Freshman; 11 Mackay Jacobsen – Sophomore; 12 Tanner Chauncey – Senior; 24 Brian Hsu – Sophomore; 25 Nate Favero- Junior; 35 Colton Shaver – Junior | Catchers: 2 Noah Hill – Sophomore; 14 Bronson Larsen – Senior; 22 David Clawson – Freshman; 35 Colton Shaver – Junior; Outfielders: 3 Brennon Anderson – Junior; 5 Jackson Bishop – Freshman; 7 Kyle Dean – (redshirt) Freshman; 17 Keaton Kringlen – Sophomore; 38 Connor Williams – Junior; 40 Matt Bushman – Freshman; 44 Brock Hale – Sophomore |

== Schedule ==
2017 BYU Cougars Game Log
Regular season
February

| Date | Opponent | Rank | Site/stadium | Television | Score | Win | Loss | Save | Attendance | Overall record | WCC record |
|---|---|---|---|---|---|---|---|---|---|---|---|
| February 17 | at #21 Georgia Tech | – | Russ Chandler Stadium | ACC Extra | 3–5 | X. Curry (1–0) | Maverik Buffo (0–1) | Z. Ryan (1) | 1,660 | 0–1 | – |
| February 18 | at Kennesaw State | – | Stillwell Stadium | Eversport | 13–4 | Brady Corless (1–0) | A. Moore (0–1) | None | 742 | 1–1 | – |
| February 20 | at Georgia State | – | Georgia State Baseball Complex | Facebook | 2–3 (10) | L. Barnette (1–0) | Riley Gates (0–1) | None | 315 | 1–2 | – |
| February 23 | vs. Northern Colorado | – | Billy Hebert Field | Facebook | 6–0 | Maverik Buffo (1–1) | C. Carroll (0–1) | None | 127 | 2–2 | – |
| February 23 | vs. San Jose State | – | Billy Hebert Field | Facebook | 2–3 (13) | J. Goldberg (1–0) | Mason Marshall (0–1) | None | 131 | 2–3 | – |
| February 24 | vs. Northern Colorado | – | Billy Hebert Field | Facebook | 10–9 (10) | Riley Gates (1–1) | B. Minnick (1–1) | None | 141 | 3–3 | – |
| February 25 | vs. San Jose State | – | Billy Hebert Field | Facebook | 2–4 | J. Banger (1–0) | Bo Burrup (0–1) | J. Goldberg | 199 | 3–4 | – |

March

| Date | Opponent | Rank | Site/stadium | Television | Score | Win | Loss | Save | Attendance | Overall record | WCC record |
|---|---|---|---|---|---|---|---|---|---|---|---|
| March 2 | at CSU Bakersfield | – | Hardt Field | YouTube | 4–5 | M. Carter (2–0) | Maverik Buffo (1–2) | Dewsnap | 653 | 3–5 | – |
| March 3 | at CSU Bakersfield | – | Hardt Field | YouTube | 10–2 | Brady Corless (2–0) | Mahlik Jones (1–1) | None | 777 | 4–5 | – |
| March 4 | at CSU Bakersfield | – | Hardt Field | YouTube | 5–7 | Moten (2–1) | Kendall Motes (0–1) | None | 640 | 4–6 | – |
| March 9 | UCSB | – | Larry H. Miller Field | TheW.tv | 8–10 | N. Davis (3–1) | Maverik Buffo (1–3) | A. Garcia | 1,447 | 4–7 | – |
| March 10 | UCSB | – | Larry H. Miller Field | TheW.tv | 7–6 | Aaron Cross (1–0) | S. Barry (0–1) | None | 2,747 | 5–7 | – |
| March 10 | UCSB | – | Larry H. Miller Field | TheW.tv | 17–3 | Hayden Rogers (1–0) | C. Clements (0–3) | None | 2,747 | 6–7 | – |
| March 11 | UCSB | – | Larry H. Miller Field | BYUtv | 14–8 | Bo Burrup (1–1) | S. Ledesma (0–2) | Aaron Cross (1) | 1,997 | 7–7 | – |
| March 14 | New Mexico State | – | Larry H. Miller Field | BYUtv | 6–8 | Mattew McHugh (2–1) | Mason Marshall (0–2) | Ruger Rodriguez | 1,166 | 7–8 | – |
| March 16 | UConn | – | Larry H. Miller Field | Facebook | 7–6 | Maverik Buffo (2–3) | R. Radue (0–2) | Aaron Cross (2) | 1,099 | 8–8 | – |
| March 17 | UConn | – | Larry H. Miller Field | TheW.tv | 7–8 | J. Russell (1–0) | Aaron Cross (1–1) | None | 1,538 | 8–9 | – |
| March 18 | UConn | – | Larry H. Miller Field | BYUtv | 10–9 | Jordan Wood (1–0) | D. Rajkowski (0–1) | None | 1,622 | 9–9 | – |
| March 23 | at Loyola Marymount* | – | George C. Page Stadium | TheW.tv | 5–3 | Maverik Buffo (3–3) | B. Redman (2–4) | Keaton Cenatiempo (1) | 175 | 10–9 | 1–0 |
| March 24 | at Loyola Marymount* | – | George C. Page Stadium | TheW.tv | 5–9 | B. Arriaga (3–0) | Bo Burrup (1–2) | H. Simon | 237 | 10–10 | 1–1 |
| March 25 | at Loyola Marymount* | – | George C. Page Stadium | TheW.tv | 0–2 | C. Abbott (4–1) | Hayden Rogers (1–1) | None | 386 | 10–11 | 1–2 |
| March 28 | at Utah | – | Smith's Ballpark | P12 MTN | 11–6 | Mason Marshall (1–2) | J. Rebar (2–4) | Keaton Cenatiempo (2) | 2,666 | 11–11 | – |
| March 30 | Saint Mary's* | – | Larry H. Miller Field | BYUtv | 7–6 | Riley Gates (2–1) | A. Hansen (0–1) | Keaton Cenatiempo (3) | 731 | 12–11 | 2–2 |
| March 31 | Saint Mary's* | – | Larry H. Miller Field | BYUtv | 6–2 | Brady Corless (3–0) | J. Valdez (3–2) | None | 1,147 | 13–11 | 3–2 |

April

| Date | Opponent | Rank | Site/stadium | Television | Score | Win | Loss | Save | Attendance | Overall record | WCC record |
|---|---|---|---|---|---|---|---|---|---|---|---|
| April 1 | Saint Mary's* | – | Larry H. Miller Field | TheW.tv | 14–1 | Hayden Rogers (2–1) | J. York (3–2) | None | 1,016 | 14–11 | 4–2 |
| April 3 | Oregon | – | Larry H. Miller Field | BYUtv | 6–9 | C. Zwetsch (1–2) | Aaron Cross (1–2) | K. Yovan | 1,845 | 14–12 | – |
| April 6 | at Pacific* | – | Klein Family Field | TheW.tv | 6–0 | Maverik Buffo (4–3) | Shreve (1–3) | None | 149 | 15–12 | 5–2 |
| April 7 | at Pacific* | – | Klein Family Field | TheW.tv | 12–1 | Brady Corless (4–0) | W. Lyndon (3–3) | Mason Marshall (1) | 393 | 16–12 | 6–2 |
| April 8 | at Pacific* | – | Klein Family Field | TheW.tv | 5–2 | Hayden Rogers (3–1) | R. Reynoso (3–4) | Keaton Cenatiempo (4) | 393 | 17–12 | 7–2 |
| April 11 | at Utah Valley | – | Brent Brown Ballpark | WAC DN | 8–3 | Jordan Wood (2–0) | O. Sebek (0–2) | None | 3,892 | 18–12 | – |
| April 13 | Pepperdine* | – | Larry H. Miller Field | BYUtv | 7–11 | R. Wilson (2–3) | Maverik Buffo (4–4) | M. Mahony | 2,058 | 18–13 | 7–3 |
| April 14 | Pepperdine* | – | Larry H. Miller Field | TheW.tv | 7–2 | Brady Corless (5–0) | J. Pendergast (4–3) | None | 2,386 | 19–13 | 8–3 |
| April 15 | Pepperdine* | – | Larry H. Miller Field | TheW.tv | 9–4 | Hayden Rogers (4–1) | W. Jensen (2–4) | Riley Gates (1) | 2,126 | 20–13 | 9–3 |
| April 18 | at Utah | – | Smith's Ballpark | P12 MTN | Cancelled- inclement weather | | | | | | |
| April 20 | at #19 San Diego* | – | Fowler Park | TheW.tv | 3–6 | Nick Sprengel (7–1) | Maverik Buffo (4–5) | Troy Conyers (10) | 546 | 20–14 | 9–4 |
| April 21 | at #19 San Diego* | – | Fowler Park | TheW.tv | 9–8 (10) | Riley Gates (3–1) | C. Burdick (2–2) | None | 1,099 | 21–14 | 10–4 |
| April 22 | at #19 San Diego* | – | Fowler Park | TheW.tv | 12–8 | Jordan Wood (3–0) | P. Richan (4–1) | None | 436 | 22–14 | 11–4 |
| April 27 | San Francisco* | – | Larry H. Miller Field | BYUtv | 19–6 | Maverik Buffo (5–5) | G. Goodman (3–4) | None | 1,247 | 23–14 | 12–4 |
| April 28 | San Francisco* | – | Larry H. Miller Field | BYUtv | 8–5 | Bo Burrup (2–2) | B. Jenkins (0–3) | Riley Gates (2) | 1,188 | 24–14 | 13–4 |
| April 29 | San Francisco* | – | Larry H. Miller Field | TheW.tv | 11–5 | Hayden Rogers (5–1) | D. Slominski (3–5) | None | 2,115 | 25–14 | 14–4 |

May

| Date | Opponent | Rank | Site/stadium | Television | Score | Win | Loss | Save | Attendance | Overall record | WCC record |
|---|---|---|---|---|---|---|---|---|---|---|---|
| May 2 | at Utah Valley | #22 | Brent Brown Ballpark | WAC DN | 23–4 | Jordan Wood (4–0) | E. Olguin (2–3) | None | 4,619 | 26–14 | – |
| May 4 | at Santa Clara* | #22 | Stephen Schott Stadium | TheW.tv | 9–3 | Maverik Buffo (6–5) | G. Nechak (1–6) | None | 155 | 27–14 | 15–4 |
| May 5 | at Santa Clara* | #22 | Stephen Schott Stadium | TheW.tv | 13–7 | Mason Marshall (1–0) | E. Lex (3–7) | None | 188 | 28–14 | 16–4 |
| May 6 | at Santa Clara* | #22 | Stephen Schott Stadium | TheW.tv | 8–4 | Hayden Rogers (6–1) | J. Steffens (3–6) | None | 188 | 29–14 | 17–4 |
| May 9 | Utah | #18 | Larry H. Miller Field | KBYU | 6–7 (13) | T. Thomas (2–0) | Kendall Motes (0–1) | R. Ottesen | 2,392 | 29–15 | – |
| May 11 | Portland* | #18 | Larry H. Miller Field | BYUtv | 23–19 | Mason Marshall (3–2) | C. Richman (0–1) | None | 1,567 | 30–15 | 18–4 |
| May 12 | Portland* | #18 | Larry H. Miller Field | BYUtv | 11–3 | Brady Corless (6–0) | G. Miller (1–8) | None | 2,158 | 31–15 | 19–4 |
| May 13 | Portland* | #18 | Larry H. Miller Field | BYUtv | 16–3 | Hayden Rogers (7–1) | K. Baker (3–6) | None | 1,631 | 32–15 | 20–4 |
| May 16 | Utah Valley | #18 | Larry H. Miller Field | BYUtv | 7–6 | Bo Burrup (3–2) | M. Briones (2–1) | Mason Marshall (2) | 1,702 | 33–15 | – |
| May 18 | at Gonzaga* | #18 | Patterson Complex | SWX | 2–10 | E. Morgan (9–2) | Maverik Buffo (6–6) | None | 629 | 33–16 | 20–5 |
| May 19 | at Gonzaga* | #18 | Patterson Complex | TheW.tv | 4–10 | J. Vernia (6–4) | Bo Burrup (3–3) | C. Legumina | 918 | 33–17 | 20–6 |
| May 20 | at Gonzaga* | #18 | Patterson Complex | ESPNU | 2–6 | D. Bies (5–2) | Hayden Rogers (7–2) | W. Mills | 1,125 | 33–18 | 20–7 |

2017 West Coast Conference baseball tournament
May

| Date | Opponent | Rank | Site/stadium | Television | Score | Win | Loss | Save | Attendance | Overall record | WCC record |
|---|---|---|---|---|---|---|---|---|---|---|---|
| May 25 | vs. #27 Loyola Marymount* | – | Banner Island Ballpark | TheW.tv | 2–3 | B. Arriaga (7–2) | Brady Corless (6–1) | C. Paiva | 1,321 | 33–19 | – |
| May 26 | vs. Saint Mary's* | – | Banner Island Ballpark | TheW.tv | 8–4 | Hayden Rogers (8–2) | J. Valdez (4–3) | None | 1,561 | 34–19 | – |
| May 26 | vs. #27 Loyola Marymount* | – | Banner Island Ballpark | TheW.tv | 5–4 | Maverik Buffo (7–6) | B. Redman (5–7) | Riley Gates (3) | 1,561 | 35–19 | – |
| May 27 | vs. #22 Gonzaga* | – | Banner Island Ballpark | TheW.tv | 10–3 | Jordan Wood (5–0) | D. Bies (5–3) | None | 1,442 | 36–19 | – |
| May 27 | vs. #22 Gonzaga* | – | Banner Island Ballpark | TheW.tv | 16–3 | Bo Burrup (4–3) | S. Hellinger (4–3) | None | 1,442 | 37–19 | – |

2017 NCAA Division I baseball tournament
June

| Date | Opponent | Rank | Site/stadium | Television | Score | Win | Loss | Save | Attendance | Overall record | WCC record |
|---|---|---|---|---|---|---|---|---|---|---|---|
| June 1 | vs. #23 CS Fullerton | #26 | Klein Field at Sunken Diamond | ESPN3 | 2–10 | C. Seabold (11–4) | Brady Corless (6–2) | None | 1,390 | 37–20 | – |
| June 2 | vs. Sacramento State | #26 | Klein Field at Sunken Diamond | ESPN3 | 6–1 | Hayden Rogers (9–2) | P. Brahms (8–4) | None | 1,420 | 38–20 | – |
| June 3 | vs. #6 Stanford | #26 | Klein Field at Sunken Diamond | ESPN3 | 1–9 | C. Castellanos (9–3) | Maverik Buffo (7–7) | None | 1,736 | 38–21 | – |

Rankings from Collegiate Baseball. Parenthesis indicate tournament seedings.
*West Coast Conference games

== Rivalries ==
BYU has two main rivalries on their schedule- the Deseret First Duel vs. Utah and the UCCU Crosstown Clash vs. Utah Valley.

== Radio Information ==
Many BYU Baseball series had a radio/internet broadcast available. 44 games were broadcast on KOVO with Brent Norton (play-by-play) calling the games for his 25th consecutive season. A rotating selection of analysts were used. 42 of the games were simulcast on BYU Radio. BYU Radio also had 1 radio exclusive this season: the early Mar. 10 game vs. UC Santa Barbara.

== TV Announcers ==
For the first time every game was shown on television or streamed live online as BYU Baseball carried the road games that weren't going to be streamed on Facebook Live.

- Feb 17: Wylie Ballard & Alex Keller
- Feb 18: No commentators
- Feb 20: Tuckett Slade
- Feb 23: Tuckett Slade
- Feb 23: Tuckett Slade
- Feb 24: Tuckett Slade
- Feb 25: Tuckett Slade
- March 2: Corey Costelloe
- March 3: Corey Costelloe
- March 4: Corey Costelloe
- March 9: Brent Norton & Gary Pullins
- March 10: Brent Norton & Jeff Bills
- March 10: Brent Norton
- March 11: Spencer Linton, Gary Sheide, & Jason Shepherd
- March 14: Spencer Linton, Gary Sheide, & Jason Shepherd
- March 16: Mitchell Marshall
- March 17: Robbie Bullough & Marc Oslund
- March 18: Dave McCann, Gary Sheide, & Jason Shepherd
- March 23: Jesse Kass & Dalton Green
- March 24: Jesse Kass & Raihan Ball
- March 25: Jesse Kass & Javier Villagomez
- March 28: Thad Anderson & Andy Lopez
- March 30: Spencer Linton, Gary Sheide, & Jason Shepherd
- March 31: Spencer Linton, Gary Sheide, & Jason Shepherd
- April 1: Brent Norton & Cameron Coughlan
- April 3: Spencer Linton, Gary Sheide, & Jason Shepherd
- April 6: Jeff Dominick & Mark Walch
- April 7: Jeff Dominick & Mark Walch
- April 8: Jeff Dominick & Mark Walch
- April 11: Jordan Bianucci & Ryan Pickens
- April 13: Spencer Linton, Gary Sheide, & Jason Shepherd
- April 14: Brent Norton & Ryan Hancock
- April 15: Brent Norton & Cameron Coughlan
- April 20: Jack Murray & John "JC" Cunningham
- April 21: Jack Murray & John Cunningham
- April 22: Jack Murray & John Cunningham
- April 27: Spencer Linton, Gary Sheide, & Jason Shepherd
- April 28: Spencer Linton, Gary Sheide, & Jason Shepherd
- April 29: Brent Norton
- May 2: Jordan Bianucci & Ryan Pickens
- May 4: David Gentile
- May 5: David Gentile
- May 6: David Gentile
- May 9: Spencer Linton, Gary Sheide, & Jason Shepherd
- May 11: Spencer Linton, Gary Sheide, & Jason Shepherd
- May 12: Spencer Linton, Gary Sheide, & Jason Shepherd
- May 13: Spencer Linton, Gary Sheide, & Jason Shepherd
- May 16: Dave McCann, Gary Sheide, & Jason Shepherd
- May 18: Sam Adams & Michael Jackson
- May 19: George Devine & Alex Jensen
- May 20: Roxy Bernstein & Wes Clements
- May 25: Steve Quis, Alex Jensen, & Meghan von Behren
- May 26: Steve Quis, Alex Jensen, & Meghan von Behren
- May 26: Steve Quis, Alex Jensen, & Meghan von Behren
- May 27: Steve Quis, Alex Jensen, & Meghan von Behren
- May 27: Steve Quis, Alex Jensen, & Meghan von Behren
- June 1: Steve Lenox & JT Snow
- June 2: Steve Lenox & JT Snow
- June 3: Steve Lenox & JT Snow
