= USC Trojans baseball =

Baseball team of the University of Southern California

USC Trojans
- 2026 USC Trojans baseball team
- Founded: 1888; 138 years ago
- Overall record: 2,944–1,745–29 (.627)
- University: University of Southern California
- Head coach: Andy Stankiewicz (4th season)
- Conference: Big Ten
- Location: Los Angeles, California
- Home stadium: Dedeaux Field (capacity: 2,500)
- Nickname: Trojans
- Colors: Cardinal and gold

College World Series champions
- 1948, 1958, 1961, 1963, 1968, 1970, 1971, 1972, 1973, 1974, 1978, 1998

College World Series runner-up
- 1960, 1995

College World Series appearances
- 1948, 1949, 1951, 1955, 1958, 1960, 1961, 1963, 1964, 1966, 1968, 1970, 1971, 1972, 1973, 1974, 1978, 1995, 1998, 2000, 2001

NCAA regional champions
- 1978, 1995, 1998, 1999, 2000, 2001, 2002, 2005, 2026

NCAA tournament appearances
- 1948, 1949, 1951, 1954, 1955, 1958, 1960, 1961, 1963, 1964, 1966, 1968, 1970, 1971, 1972, 1973, 1974, 1975, 1977, 1978, 1984, 1988, 1989, 1990, 1991, 1993, 1994, 1995, 1996, 1997, 1998, 1999, 2000, 2001, 2002, 2005, 2015, 2025, 2026

Conference regular season champions
- 1930, 1932, 1935, 1936, 1939, 1942, 1946, 1947, 1948, 1949, 1951, 1952, 1953, 1954, 1955, 1956, 1957, 1958, 1959, 1960, 1961, 1963, 1964, 1966, 1968, 1970, 1971, 1972, 1973, 1974, 1975, 1977, 1978, 1991, 1995, 1996, 2001, 2002

The USC Trojans baseball program represents the University of Southern California in college baseball. Established in 1888, the team is a member of the National Collegiate Athletic Association and the Big Ten Conference. USC’s home field is Dedeaux Field, which is named in honor of former head coach and National College Baseball Hall of Fame inductee Rod Dedeaux.

The USC Trojans are the most successful team in the history of American college baseball, having won more baseball national championships than any other program across all divisions of college baseball, with 12 national championships.

USC's most notable baseball coach was Rod Dedeaux, who coached from 1942 to 1986 and led the school to 11 of its NCAA championships, including five straight from 1970 to 1974. The first Trojan national championship came in 1948. The 12th and most recent NCAA championship came in 1998.

== History ==
=== The early years ===
The Trojans began recognizing baseball as a school sport in 1889. As with many programs during the late 19th century and early 20th century, the Trojans lacked a consistent head coach, when they even had one at all. It was not until 1908 that the Trojans had an official head coach, Harvey Holmes, but Holmes only coached the team for one year. Holmes also coached other sports at USC including football and track. The team would get another coach during the 1911 season, Curtiss Bernard. Bernard also only coached for a year, and in 1912 the Trojans once again had a one-year coach in Len Burrell.

During the World War I years, the USC baseball team was made up mostly of law school students, but the team opened up to all students for the 1916 and 1917 seasons. Following the conclusion of the war, the baseball team was coached by "Gloomy Gus" Henderson in 1920 (who would also coach the Trojan basketball team for two years and the football team for six). Henderson would join forces with Willis Hunter as co-coaches for the 1921 season, but the team was left without a coach for the 1922 season. In 1923 the team was coached by George Wheeler, who also coached the law students during the 1914 season. Wheeler coached the team for a year, and would mark the last time the Trojan baseball team has lacked consistency at the coaching position.

=== Sam Crawford era ===
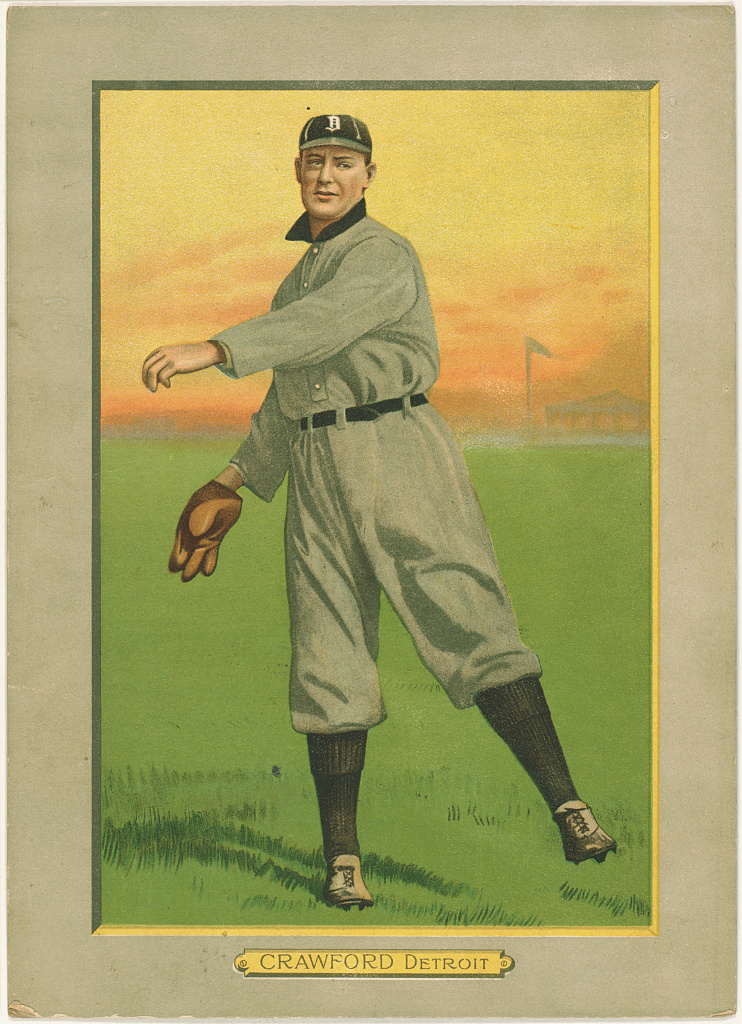
Sam Earl "Wahoo Sam" Crawford 1911 baseball card

Long-time Major League Baseball player and multiple MLB record-holder Sam Crawford took over as head coach of USC baseball in 1924. Crawford would mark the end of inconsistency at the coaching ranks for the baseball program. During his tenure, the program slowly began to rise to national prominence, and Crawford helped to create the California Intercollegiate Baseball Association (CIBA) in 1927. Crawford coached the Trojans for six years before turning the reigns over to Sam Barry. Crawford compiled an overall record of 59-46-3, including a second-place finish during the initial campaign for the CIBA.

=== Sam Barry era ===
In 1930, Sam Barry took over the USC baseball program and immediately built off of the success his predecessor had. On his arrival at USC in 1929, he was named head basketball coach and was made an assistant for the USC football team under his friend and colleague, Howard Jones. When Jones died suddenly in 1941, Barry was named his successor, and served as head coach for all three major USC sports teams simultaneously. Barry won the CIBA title in his first year, finishing 11–2 and 25–5–1 overall. During the next decade, Barry would claim four more CIBA titles. Barry coached the Trojans from 1930–1941 before joining the Navy during World War II. As he left, he recommended that Jeff Cravath become the head football coach, Julie Bescos become the head basketball coach, and Rod Dedeaux, the captain of his 1935 team, become the head baseball coach. Upon his return, Barry would resume coaching the Trojans alongside Dedeaux. Barry finished with a career mark of 219–89–3. He remains one of only three coaches to coach a Final Four game and in a College World Series. Barry was elected to the inaugural class of the American Baseball Coaches Association Hall of Fame in 1966.

=== Barry-Dedeaux years ===
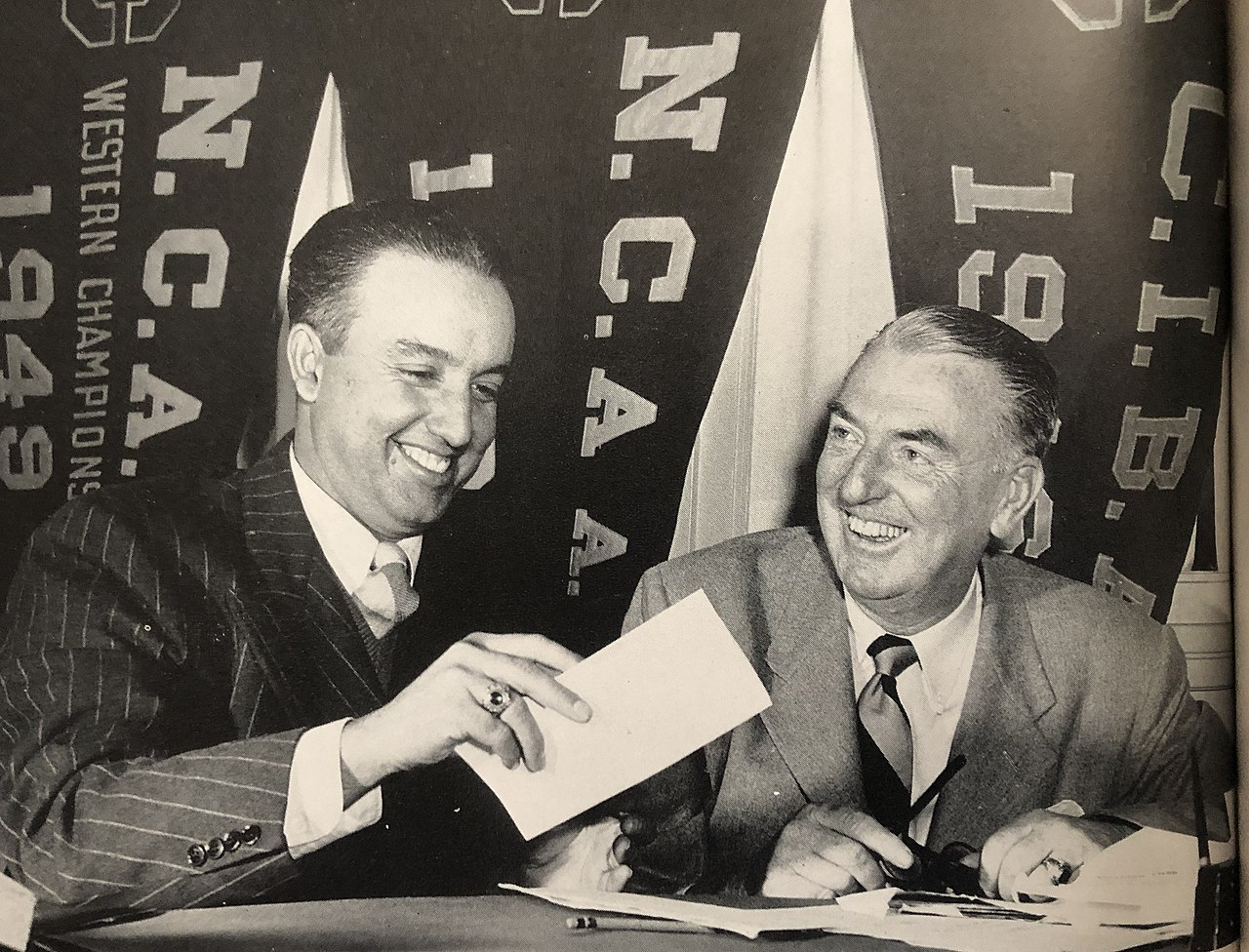
Rod Dedeaux and Sam Barry circa 1950

When Sam Barry returned from World War II in 1946, Barry and Dedeaux served as co-coaches, with Dedeaux running the team each year until Barry finished the basketball season. The arrangement was so successful that USC won the College World Series in 1948.

==== 1948 National Championship ====
After finishing the season 40–12–1, USC met Yale for the 1948 NCAA Division I baseball championship at the second College World Series. The CWS in 1948 was a best 2-out-of-3 format. The games were played on June 25 and June 26, with June 26 being a doubleheader if necessary. USC won the first game, 3–1 to take a 1–0 series lead, but lost game 2 by a score of 8–3. The third and final game immediately followed game 2. USC scored a run in the first inning to claim a lead it would not surrender. USC claimed their first national championship with a game 3 victory, 9–2. Although USC won, they were unable to prevent future President of the United States of America, George Bush, from collecting a double in the final game.

=== Rod Dedeaux era ===
After being co-head coach in 1942 with his former college coach Sam Barry, Dedeaux took over the USC program in 1943. Barry recommended Dedeaux to coach the team when Sam Barry joined the Navy. Dedeaux coached the Trojans by himself for the next three years, until once again joining forces with Barry as co-head coaches. After Barry's death in September 1950, Dedeaux became the sole coach of USC baseball.

After taking over in 1951, Dedeaux became the sole coach and proceeded to build on the early success to establish the strongest program in collegiate baseball. The Trojans claimed 11 straight CIBA championships in Dedeaux's first 11 years. The Trojans claimed nine outright titles and tied for first in 1953 and 1957. Following the 1957 campaign, Dedeaux's team finished the season 36–8 overall and earned the first of his 10 national championships as sole coach.

==== Retirement and legacy ====
After a total of 45 years as head coach of USC, Dedeaux decided to retire following the 1986 campaign. Dedeaux drastically changed college baseball and left historic marks on the sport. Dedeaux won a total of 11 national championships, compiled a record of 1,332–571–11, and completed a stretch of 37 years without a losing season. He retired as the winningest coach in college baseball history and held that distinction until 1994 when the record was broken by Texas head coach Cliff Gustafson.

While he was at USC, Dedeaux also served as coach of the United States national baseball team at both the 1964 Summer Olympics in Tokyo, Japan, and the 1984 Summer Olympics in Los Angeles, when baseball was a demonstration sport prior to its elevation to full medal status in 1988.

Following his retirement, Dedeaux became the Director of Baseball for USC, and for the rest of his life remained a beloved annual presence at the College World Series in Omaha, Nebraska. USC's baseball field was named after him when it opened in 1974. He was inducted into the American Baseball Coaches Association's Hall of Fame in 1970, and in 1999 was named the Coach of the Century by Collegiate Baseball magazine.

Dedeaux died at age 91 in Glendale, California, of complications from a December 2, 2005, stroke. He was survived by his wife of 66 years, the former Helen Jones, and their four children. On July 4, 2006, Dedeaux was inducted as a member of the first class of inductees into the College Baseball Hall of Fame.

=== Post Rod Dedeaux ===
==== Mike Gillespie ====
USC reached out to Mike Gillespie, one of Rod Dedeaux's former players, to replace the recently retired coach. Gillespie played under Dedeaux from 1960–1962, and after a successful coaching stint at the College of the Canyons, he was named just the fourth head coach of USC baseball since 1924.

===== 1998 National Championship =====
Gillespie was named National Coach of the Year in 1998.

===== Retirement and legacy =====
After 20 years as the head coach of the Trojans, Gillespie decided to retire following the 2006 season. During his career, Gillespie kept Trojan baseball in the spotlight, especially in the years leading up to and following the 1998 championship. He finished with an overall record of 763–471–2 during his tenure as coach of the Trojans. As a result of his success, Gillespie earned the honor to coach the 2000 USA National Team. During his tenure he was named Pac-10 coach of the year four times, while his teams produced 44 All-America selections, 94 draft picks, and 25 Major League players.

After sitting out the 2007 season, Gillespie was named coach of the UC Irvine Anteaters in September 2007. Gillespie replaced Dave Serrano, who had just guided the Anteaters to their first CWS appearance but left to take over at Cal State Fullerton, his alma mater, after George Horton left Fullerton to head the new program at Oregon.

==== Chad Kreuter ====
In June 2006, Chad Kreuter became only the fifth man to earn the title of head baseball coach at USC since 1924. Kreuter replaced his father-in-law, Mike Gillespie, after Gillespie retired.

Kreuter failed to reach the postseason in each of his four years as head coach. He produced an overall record of 111–117 during this time, never posting a winning record. During his tenure, the Trojans twice finished in last place in the Pac-10, and never higher than fifth in the conference. Although his players flourished in the classroom, he came under heavy criticism late in his tenure.

==== 2010s ====
In August 2010, Kreuter was relieved of his duties, and was replaced by assistant coach and former Loyola Marymount head coach Frank Cruz.

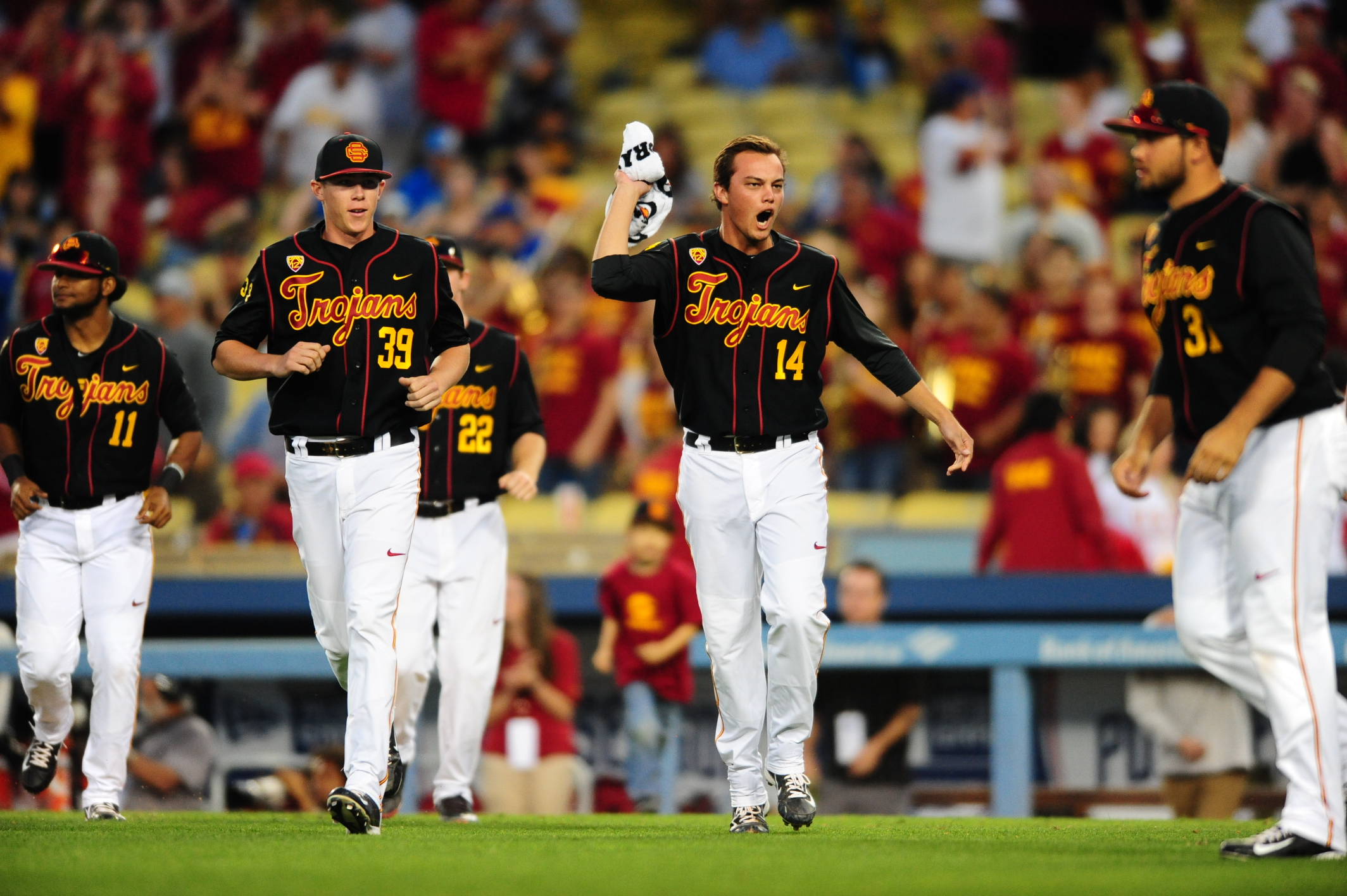
USC celebrates a win over UCLA at Dodger Stadium in 2015

On May 30, 2019, Dan Hubbs was informed that his contract would not be renewed by the university, but athletic director Lynn Swann thanked Hubbs in a statement for his hard work coaching the program, and insisted he would always remain a great Trojan.

==== Jason Gill ====
Heading into the next chapter, former Loyola Marymount head coach Jason Gill was hired to be the new head coach of the USC Trojans baseball program.

During Gill's first season in 2020, the Trojans got off to a hot start, winning 10 of their first 15 games, including consecutive victories over nationally ranked powerhouses Vanderbilt and TCU in back-to-back days. Fans in Troy got excited about the program possibly making a return to the NCAA Tournament that year, but the COVID-19 pandemic in mid-March abruptly cancelled the rest of the spring.

Gill lost his footing during the challenging circumstances of the pandemic, and the university chose to amicably part ways with him following his third season in 2022.

==== Andy Stankiewicz ====
On July 3, 2022, the Trojans hired Andy Stankiewicz as their new head coach. Stankiewicz had earned a highly respected reputation in baseball, first as a hard-nosed infielder during his playing days, reaching the major leagues with persistence and determination, and then in coaching as an accomplished skipper for Grand Canyon University, the New York Yankees organization, and USA Baseball. He also recorded two appearances in the College World Series as an assistant for Arizona State University.

During Stankiewicz's first season in 2023, the Trojans showed significant improvement under their new head coach. They won 34 games, including 26 at home, improved up to fourth place in the Pac-12 Conference standings, won seven of their ten conference series. Many publications projected USC to receive an NCAA Tournament berth, but the team was ultimately left out. This decision drew criticism from fans and some observers, who believed the Trojans had assembled a tournament-worthy résumé. Despite the disappointment, the season was widely viewed as an important step forward for the program. That summer, Dedeaux Field began undergoing renovations as part of a multi-year stadium improvement project.

In 2024, the Trojans began playing at alternate sites while their home stadium was being refurbished. They performed at a nearly identical clip from the previous year, going 31-28, with a 17-12 record in conference play (a slightly higher winning percentage than their 17-13 league record the year before), and again finished in fourth place in the Pac-12 Conference.

In 2025, the Trojans began playing in the Big Ten Conference, again played home games at alternate sites, and still finished in fourth place for the third consecutive season, but they finally took the big steps forward that many fans predicted. They improved to 37 wins, this time making the NCAA Tournament, and the program had its most successful season in the last ten years.

== Ballparks ==
=== Bovard Field ===
Bovard Field was the former home of USC baseball until Dedeaux Field opened in 1974.

The baseball field was aligned (home to center field) similar to Dedeaux Field, but a few degrees clockwise, nearly true north, but just slightly west. Home plate was located in today's E.F. Hutton Park and left field was bounded by Watt Way. Beyond first base, a large eucalyptus tree came into play; while its trunk was in foul territory, some of its branches crossed into fair territory and guarded the foul line in shallow right field.

=== Dedeaux Field ===
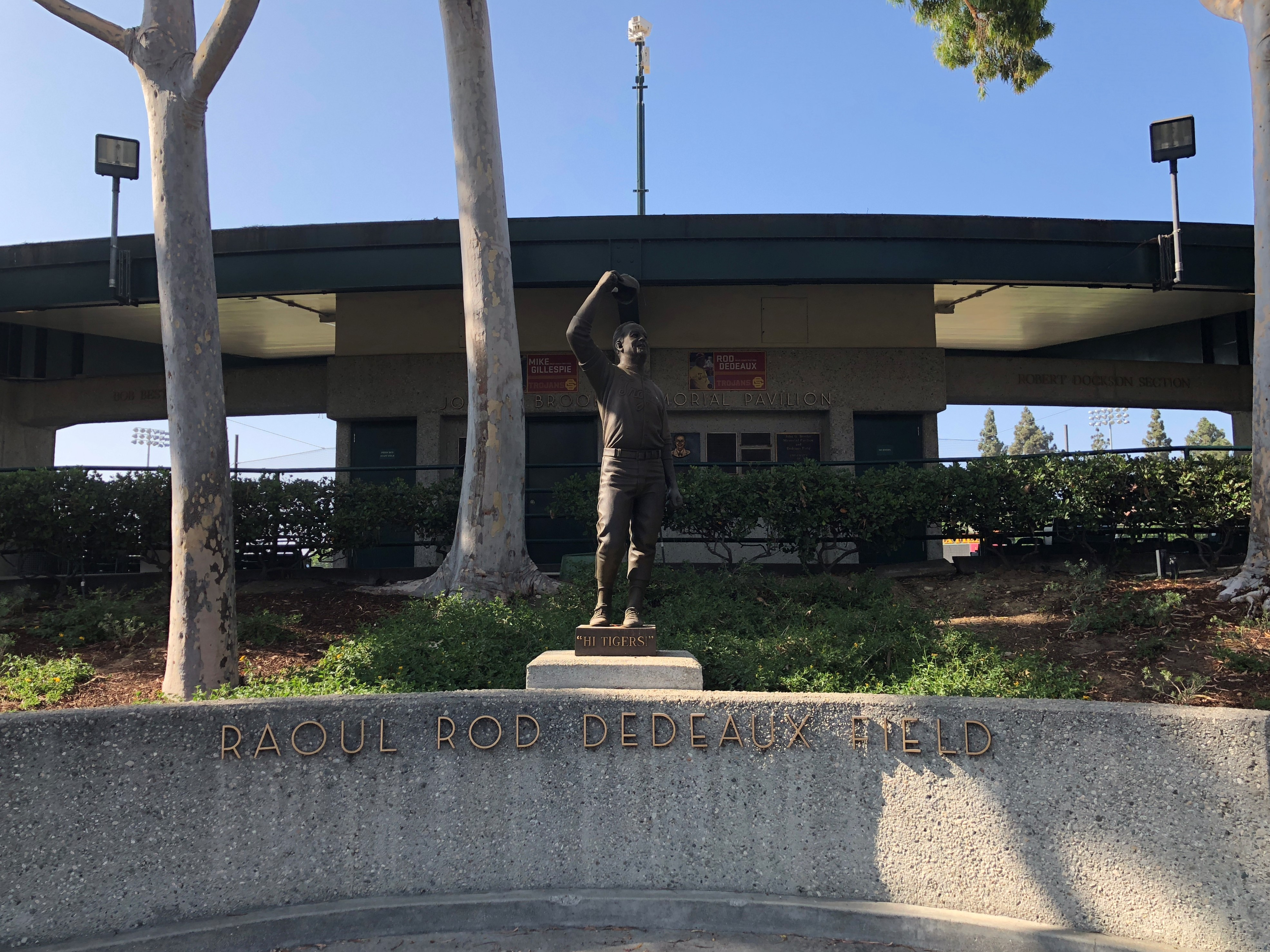
Dedeaux Field

Dedeaux Field is the home field for the USC Trojans baseball team. It is named after the former legendary USC coach Rod Dedeaux, who coached from 1942 to 1986. The Trojans moved into the ballpark in 1974, the same year that they won their fifth consecutive national championship. After many renovations, the current capacity is 2,500 people.

== Head coaches ==
- Records are through March 11, 2020

Tenure	Coach	Years	Record	Pct.
1889–1907	No Coach on Record			
1908	Harvey Holmes	1	17–2	.895
1909–1910	No Coach on Record			
1911	Curtiss Bernard	1	10–3	.769
1912	Len Burrell	1	6–9	.400
1913	No Coach on Record			
1914–1915	USC was Represented by School of Law			
1916–1917	USC was Represented by School of Law (Open to all students)			
1918–1919	World War I - No Team			
1920	Elmer "Gloomy Gus" Henderson	1	9-4-1	.679
1921	Willis O. Hunter/Henderson	1	9–3	.750
1922	No Coach on Record			
1922–1923	Branch Bocock	2	15-15-2	.500
1924–1929	Sam Crawford	6	59-46-3	.560
1930–1941	Sam Barry	12	219-89-3	.709
1942	Barry-Dedeaux	See Below		
1943–1945	Rod Dedeaux	See Below		
1946–1950	Barry-Dedeaux	6	170-70-3	.706
1951–1986	Rod Dedeaux	45	1,332-571-11	.699
1987–2006	Mike Gillespie	20	763-471-2	.618
2007–2010	Chad Kreuter	3	83–85	.494
2011–2012	Frank Cruz	2	48–63	.432
2013–2019	Dan Hubbs	7	186–198–1	.484
2020–2022	Jason Gill	3	60–59	.504
2023–present	Andy Stankiewicz	3	102–74–1	.579

Longest Tenure
Rank	Name	Seasons
1	Rod Dedeaux	45
2	Mike Gillespie	20
3	Sam Barry	12

Most Wins
Rank	Name	Wins
1	Rod Dedeaux	1,332
2	Mike Gillespie	763
3	Sam Barry	219

Best Winning Pct.
Rank	Name	Pct.
1	Sam Barry	.934
2	Barry-Dedeaux	.706
3	Rod Dedeaux	.699

== Year-by-Year Results ==
Through the end of the 2021 season.
Final Rankings are from Collegiate Baseball Division I Final Polls (1959–2006)

Year	Coach	Record	Conference	Notes
1889		0–1		
1890	No Games			
1891	No Games			
1892		5-0-1		
1893*		4–6		
1894		0–1		
1895	No Games			
1896		0–2		
1897	No Games			
1898		8–3		
1899		3–4		
1900		0–1		
1901	No Games			
1902		0–6		
1903		3–3		
1904		1–4		
1905		6–5		
1906		12-4-1		
1907		7–6		
1908	Harvey Holmes	17–2		
1909		11–7		
1910		4–6		
1911	Curtiss Bernard	10–3		
1912	Len Burrell	6–9		
1913		2–6		
1914**	George Wheeler	8–2		
1915**	Ralph Glaze	5–10		
1916***	Charles "Pat" Millikan	6-5-1		
1917***	Phil Koerner/Millikan	5–6		
1918****		0–1		
1919	World War I - No Team			
1920	Elmer"Gloomy Gus"Henderson	9-4-1		
1921	Willis O. Hunter/Henderson	9–3		
1922		5–6		
1923	George Wheeler	7–11		
1924	Sam Crawford	4–7		
1925	Sam Crawford	9-4-1		
1926	Sam Crawford	11-6-2		
1927	Sam Crawford	8–15	6–6	Finished 2nd in the conference
1928	Sam Crawford	12–7	5–7	Finished tied for 3rd in conference
1929	Sam Crawford	15–7	8–6	Finished 3rd in the conference
1930	Sam Barry	25-5-1	11-2-0	Finished 1st in the conference
1931	Sam Barry	24-6-0	14-4-0	Finished 2nd in the conference
1932	Sam Barry	15-3-1	11-2-0	Finished 1st in the conference
1933	Sam Barry	11-8-0	3-6-0	Finished tied for 3rd in the conference
1934	Sam Barry	22-10-0	10-5-0	Finished 2nd in the conference
1935	Sam Barry	16-12-0	10-5-0	Finished tied for 1st in the conference
1936	Sam Barry	19-9-0	13-2-0	Finished 1st in the conference
1937	Sam Barry	16-8-0	10-5-0	Finished 2nd in the conference
1938	Sam Barry	24-7-0	11-4-0	Finished 2nd in the conference
1939	Sam Barry	23-7-0	11-4-0	Finished tied for 1st in the conference
1940	Sam Barry	12-8-0	8-7-0	Finished 3rd in the conference
1941	Sam Barry	12-6-1	9-6-0	Finished 3rd in the conference
1942	Barry-Dedeaux	18-5-1	12-2-0	Finished 1st in the conference
1943	Rod Dedeaux	27-7-3	1-2-0	Finished 2nd in the conference
1944	Rod Dedeaux	16-13-0	4-4-0	Finished 2nd in the conference
1945	Rod Dedeaux	13-15-1	3-5-0	Finished 2nd in conference
1946	Barry-Dedeaux	24-8-0	11-1-0	Finished 1st in the conference
1947	Barry-Dedeaux	25-12-0	11-4-0	Finished 1st in the conference
1948	Barry-Dedeaux	40-12-1	13-2-0	Finished 1st in the conference
1949	Barry-Dedeaux	37-14-1	12-2-0	Finished 1st in the conference
1950	Barry-Dedeaux	26-19-0	8-7-0	Finished tied for 3rd in conference
1951	Rod Dedeaux	32-19-0	11-5-0	Finished 1st in the conference
1952	Rod Dedeaux	37-12-1	11-5-0	Finished 1st in the conference
1953	Rod Dedeaux	25-25-1	10-6-0	Finished tied for 1st in the conference
1954	Rod Dedeaux	20-11-1	11-5-0	Finished 1st in the conference
1955	Rod Dedeaux	30-10-0	12-3-0	Finished 1st in the conference
1956	Rod Dedeaux	26-11-0	14-2-0	Finished 1st in the conference
1957	Rod Dedeaux	19-13-0	12-4-0	Finished tied for 1st in the conference
1958	Rod Dedeaux	36-8-0	14-2-0	Finished 1st in the conference
1959	Rod Dedeaux	29-6-1	14-2-0	Finished 1st in the conference
1960	Rod Dedeaux	40-14-0	12-4-0	Finished 1st in the conference
1961	Rod Dedeaux	43-9-1	12-4-0	Finished 1st in the conference
1962	Rod Dedeaux	33-13-2	11-5-0	Finished 2nd in conference
1963	Rod Dedeaux	37-16-1	10-6-0	Finished 1st in the conference
1964	Rod Dedeaux	40-15-0	17-3-0	Finished 1st in the conference
1965	Rod Dedeaux	30-15-1	9-11-0	Finished 5th in the conference
1966	Rod Dedeaux	49-11-1	16-4-0	Finished 1st in the conference
1967	Rod Dedeaux	38-13-2	9-6-0	Finished 3rd in the conference
1968	Rod Dedeaux	49-14-1	15-2-1	Finished 1st in the conference
1969	Rod Dedeaux	42-12-1	13-8-0	Finished 3rd in the conference
1970	Rod Dedeaux	51-13-1	11-3-0	Finished 1st in the Pac-10
1971	Rod Dedeaux	54-13-0	17-0-0	Finished 1st in the Pac-10
1972	Rod Dedeaux	50-13-1	14-4-0	Finished 1st in the Pac-10
1973	Rod Dedeaux	51-11-0	14-4-0	Finished 1st in the Pac-10
1974	Rod Dedeaux	50-21-0	11-7-0	Finished 1st in the Pac-10
1975	Rod Dedeaux	43-14-1	12-4-0	Finished 1st in the Pac-10
1976	Rod Dedeaux	36-28-3	15-8-1	Finished 2nd the Pac-10
1977	Rod Dedeaux	51-20-0	16-2-0	Finished 1st in the Pac-10
1978	Rod Dedeaux	56-10-0	15-3-0	Finished 1st in the Pac-10
1979	Rod Dedeaux	34-26-1	15-15-0	Finished 4th in the Pac-10
1980	Rod Dedeaux	30-25-1	13-17-0	Finished 5th in the Pac-10
1981	Rod Dedeaux	38-25-0	15-15-0	Finished 3rd in the Pac-10
1982	Rod Dedeaux	25-38-0	9-21-0	Finished 6th in the Pac-10
1983	Rod Dedeaux	33-24-1	17-13-0	Finished tied for 2nd the Pac-10
1984	Rod Dedeaux	48-25-0	18-12-0	Finished tied for 2nd the Pac-10
1985	Rod Dedeaux	24-45-0	5-25-0	Finished 6th in the Pac-10
1986	Rod Dedeaux	26-30-0	12-18-0	Rod Dedeaux’s final season before his retirement. Finished 4th in the Pac-10
1987	Mike Gillespie	32–28	12–18	Finished tied for 5th in the Pac-10
1988	Mike Gillespie	36-27-1	13–17	Finished 4th in the Pac-10
1989	Mike Gillespie	42-25-1	16–14	Finished 3rd in the Pac-10
1990	Mike Gillespie	41–23	18–12	Finished 3rd in the Pac-10
1991	Mike Gillespie	46-18-1	23–7	Finished 1st in the Pac-10
1992	Mike Gillespie	29–26	13–17	Finished 6th in the Pac-10
1993	Mike Gillespie	35–29	15–15	Finished 4th in the Pac-10
1994	Mike Gillespie	42–20	19–11	Finished 3rd in the Pac-10
1995	Mike Gillespie	49–22	21–9	Finished 1st in the Pac-10
1996	Mike Gillespie	44-17-1	24–6	Finished 1st in the Pac-10
1997	Mike Gillespie	45–20	17–13	Finished 3rd in the Pac-10
1998	Mike Gillespie	49–17	21–9	Finished 2nd in the Pac-10
1999	Mike Gillespie	36–26	17–7	Finished 2nd in the Pac-10
2000	Mike Gillespie	44–20	16–8	Finished 4th in the Pac-10
2001	Mike Gillespie	45–19	18–6	Finished 1st in the Pac-10
2002	Mike Gillespie	37–24	17–7	Finished 1st in the Pac-10
2003	Mike Gillespie	28–28	11–13	Finished tied for 5th in the Pac-10
2004	Mike Gillespie	24–32	11–13	Finished tied for 6th in the Pac-10
2005	Mike Gillespie	41–22	15–9	Finished tied for 3rd in the Pac-10
2006	Mike Gillespie	25–33	11–13	Mike Gillespie Retired; Finished tied for 5th in the Pac-10
2007	Chad Kreuter	27–29	8–16	Finished 9th in the Pac-10
2008	Chad Kreuter	28–28	11–13	Finished tied for 6th in the Pac-10
2009	Chad Kreuter	28–28	13–14	Finished tied for 5th in the Pac-10
2010	Chad Kreuter	28–32	7–20	Finished 10th in the Pac-10
2011	Frank Cruz	25–31	13–14	Finished 7th in the Pac-10
2012	Frank Cruz	23–32	8–22	Finished 10th in the Pac-12
2013	Dan Hubbs	20–36	10–20	Finished 9th in the Pac-12
2014	Dan Hubbs	29–24	16–14	Finished tied for 5th in the Pac-12
2015	Dan Hubbs	39–21	18–12	Finished tied for 3rd in the Pac-12
2016	Dan Hubbs	28–28	15–15	Finished 7th in the Pac-12
2017	Dan Hubbs	21–34	8–22	Finished 12th in the Pac-12
2018	Dan Hubbs	26–28	12–18	Finished 8th in the Pac-12
2019	Dan Hubbs	25–29–1	13–15–1	Finished 7th in the Pac-12
2020*****	Jason Gill	10–5	0-0 (Note: The rest of the 2020 season was canceled due to COVID-19)	Finished T-3rd in the Pac-12
2021	Jason Gill	25–26	13–17	Finished T-8th in the Pac-12
2022	Jason Gill	25-28	8-22	Last Place in the Pac-12
2023	Andy Stankiewicz	34-21-1	17-12	4th Place in the Pac-12
2024	Andy Stankiewicz	31-28	17-12	4th Place in the Pac-12
2025	Andy Stankiewicz	35-21	18-12	4th Place in the Big Ten
2026	Andy Stankiewicz	0-0	0-0	In Progress
*Includes six games played in fall of 1892.; **USC was represented by School of Law team.; ***USC was represented by School of Law but the team was open to all students.; ****No official team due to World War I; students briefly organized team.; *****From March 12 on the rest of the 2020 season was canceled due to the COVID-19

== National Championships ==
Year	Coach	Record	Result
1948	Barry-Dedeaux	40-12-1	Defeated Yale, 9-2
1958	Rod Dedeaux	36-8-0	Defeated Missouri, 8-7
1961	Rod Dedeaux	43-9-1	Defeated Oklahoma St., 1-0
1963	Rod Dedeaux	37-16-1	Defeated Arizona, 5-2
1968	Rod Dedeaux	49-14-1	Defeated Southern Illinois, 4-3
1970	Rod Dedeaux	51-13-1	Defeated Florida St., 2-1
1971	Rod Dedeaux	54-13-0	Defeated Southern Illinois, 7-2
1972	Rod Dedeaux	50-13-1	Defeated Arizona St., 1-0
1973	Rod Dedeaux	51-11-0	Defeated Arizona St., 4-3
1974	Rod Dedeaux	50-21-0	Defeated Miami, 7-3
1978	Rod Dedeaux	56-10-0	Defeated Arizona St., 10-3
1998	Mike Gillespie	49-17-0	Defeated Arizona St., 21-14
Total national championships			12

== USC in the NCAA tournament ==
- The NCAA Division I baseball tournament started in 1947.
- The format of the tournament has changed through the years.

Year	Record	Pct.	Notes
USC did not make the tournament in 1947.
1948	5-1	.833	Won the NCAA Western playoffs; College World Series Champions
1949	3-3	.500	Won the NCAA Western playoffs; College World Series (3rd Place)
USC did not make the tournament in 1950.
1951	2-2	.500	College World Series
USC did not make the tournament in 1952 or 1953.
1954	1-2	.333	Lost to Fresno St. in NCAA District 8 playoffs
1955	2-2	.500	Won NCAA District 8 playoffs; College World Series
USC did not make the tournament in 1956 or 1957.
1958	7-1	.875	Won NCAA District 8 playoffs; College World Series Champions
USC did not make the tournament in 1959.
1960	8-3	.727	Won NCAA District 8 playoffs and Finals; College World Series Runner-up
1961	9-1	.900	Won NCAA District 8 playoffs and Finals; College World Series Champions
USC did not make the tournament in 1962.
1963	7-2	.778	Won NCAA District 8 Finals; College World Series Champions
1964	6-2	.750	Won NCAA District 8 playoffs and Finals; College World Series
USC did not make the tournament in 1965.
1966	6-2	.750	Won NCAA District 8 Finals; College World Series
USC did not make the tournament in 1967.
1968	7-2	.875	Won NCAA District 8 Finals; College World Series Champions
USC did not make the tournament in 1969.
1970	6-1	.857	Won NCAA District 8 Finals; College World Series Champions
1971	7-2	.778	Won NCAA District 8 Finals; College World Series Champions
1972			College World Series Champions
1973			College World Series Champions
1974			College World Series Champions
1975	1-2	.333	Eliminated by Pepperdine in the West Regional
USC did not make the tournament in 1976.
1977			
1978			College World Series Champions
USC did not make the tournament from 1979 to 1983.
1984			
USC did not make the tournament from 1985 to 1987.
1988			
1989			
1990			
1991			
USC did not make the tournament in 1992.
1993	3-2	.600	Lost in the NCAA Central II Regional Finals to Texas
1994	3-2	.600	Lost in the NCAA South Regional Finals to LSU
1995	8-3	.727	Won the NCAA West Regional; College World Series Runner-up
1996	3-2	.600	Lost in the NCAA Central II Regional Finals to Oklahoma St.
1997	3-2	.600	Lost in the NCAA South II Regional Finals to Alabama
1998	9-2	.818	Won the NCAA East Regional; College World Series Champions
1999	3-3	.500	Won the Los Angeles Regional; Lost to Stanford in the Palo Alto Super Regional
2000	6-2	.750	Won the Fullerton Regional & Atlanta Super Regional; College World Series (5th Place)
2001	6-2	.750	Won the Los Angeles Regional & Super Regional; College World Series (5th Place)
2002	3-2	.600	Won the Los Angeles Regional; Lost to Stanford in the Palo Alto Super Regional
USC did not make the tournament in 2003 or 2004.
2005	4-3	.571	Won the Long Beach Regional; Lost to Oregon St. in the Corvallis Super Regional
USC did not make the tournament from 2006 to 2014.
2015	2-2	.500	Lost to Virginia in the Lake Elisinore Regional
USC did not make the tournament from 2016 to 2024.
2025	2-2	.500	Lost to Oregon State in the Corvallis Regional
2026	4-1	.800	Won the College Station Regional; TBD
Totals	179–73	.710	

== NCAA records ==
=== Individual records ===
Year	Player	Record	Notes
1960	Bruce Gardner	Innings Pitched in a Season (182.2)	No. 2 all-time
1960	Bruce Gardner	Victories (18)	Led the nation in 1960
1964	Walt Peterson	Victories (17)	Led the nation in 1964
1966	John Stewart	Victories (16)	Led the nation in 1966
1970	Dan Stoligrosz	Home runs in a Season (14)	Led the nation in 1970
1972	Fred Lynn	Home runs in a Season (14)	Led the nation in 1972
1974	Rich Dauer	Hits in a Season (108)	Led the nation in 1974
1974	Rich Dauer	Runs Batted In (92)	Led the nation in 1974
1974	Rich Dauer	Total Bases (181)	Led the nation in 1974
1984	Mark McGwire	Home runs in a Season (32)	Led the nation in 1984
1987	Brian Nichols	Saves (17)	Led the nation in 1987
1993	Dan Hubbs	Saves (18)	Led the nation in 1993
1995–1998	Jack Krawczyk	Career Saves (49)	No. 2 all-time
1998	Seth Etherton	Strikeouts (182)	Led the nation in 1998
1998	Jack Krawczyk	Saves in a Season (23)	No. 1 all-time
2001	Mark Prior	Strikeouts (202)	Led the nation in 2001
2005	Ian Kennedy	Strikeouts (158)	Led the nation in 2005
Source:"Official 2008 NCAA Baseball Records Book" (PDF). ncaa.org.

=== Team records ===
Year	Record	Notes
	All-Time Win Percentage (.654)	No. 16 overall
	All-Time Victories (2,589)	No. 3 overall
1973	Home runs (62)	Led the nation in 1973
Source:"Official 2008 NCAA Baseball Records Book" (PDF). ncaa.org.

== Player awards ==
=== All-Americans ===
The following is a listing of first team selections. Other selections are available at USC's official website.

- 1948

Wally Hood (p) - ABCA
Art Mazmanian (2b) - ABCA
Hank Workman (of) - ABCA

- 1949

Jim Brideweser (p) - ABCA

- 1950

Jay Roundy (of) - ABCA

- 1952

Hal Charnofsky (ss) - ABCA

- 1953

Ed Simpson (1b) - ABCA

- 1956

Kent Hadley (1b) - ABCA

- 1957

Bill Olson (cf) - ABCA

- 1958

Jerry Siegert (of) - ABCA

- 1959

Bill Thom (p) - ABCA
Johnny Werhas (3b) - ABCA

- 1960

Bruce Gardner (p) - ABCA

- 1961

Willie Ryan (1b) - ABCA

- 1964

Walt Peterson (p) - ABCA

- 1970

Brent Strom (p) - ABCA

- 1971

Steve Busby (p) - ABCA

- 1972

Fred Lynn (of) - ABCA

- 1973

Roy Smalley (ss) - ABCA

- 1974

Rich Dauer (3b) - ABCA

- 1975

Steve Kemp () - ABCA

- 1978

Bill Bordley (p) - ABCA

- 1981

Dan Davidsmeier (ss) - ABCA

- 1984

Mark McGwire (1b) - ABCA & BA

- 1988

Jim Campanis (c) - BA

- 1991

Mark Smith (of) - BA & CB

- 1995

Gabe Alvarez (ss) - ABCA
Geoff Jenkins (of) - BA & CB

- 1998

Seth Etherton (p) - ABCA, BA, & CB
Jack Krawczyk (p) - ABCA & CB

- 1999

Barry Zito (p) - ABCA, BA, & CB

- 2001

Mark Prior (p) - ABCA, BA, & CB

- 2005

Jeff Clement (c) - ABCA, BA, & CB
Ian Kennedy (p) - BA & CB

- 2015

Garrett Stubbs (c) - ABCA/R, BA, R, JSR

Legend

- ABCA = American Baseball Coaches Association
- BA = Baseball America
- CB = Collegiate Baseball
- R=Rawlings
- JSR=Jewish Sports Review

=== All-College World Series ===
- 1958

Mike Castanon (2b)
Fred Scott (ss)
Ron Fairly (of)
Bill Thom^ (p)

- 1960

William Ryan (1b)
Bob Levingston (of)
Mickey McNamee (of)
Art Ersepke (of)
Bill Heath (c)
Bruce Gardner (p)

- 1961

William Ryan (1b)
Art Ersepke (of)
Larry Himes (c)
Jim Withers (p)
Larry Hankammer (p)

- 1963

Gary Holman (1b)
Kenny Washington (of)
Buddy Hollowell^ (c)
Walt Peterson (p)

- 1964

Gary Sutherland (ss)
Willy Brown (of)

- 1966

John Stewart (p)

- 1968

Bill Seinsoth^* (1b)
Bill Lee (p)

- 1970

Frank Alfano (2b)
Dan Stoligrosz (3b)
Jim Barr (p)

- 1971

Frank Alfano (2b)
Fred Lynn* (of)
Mark Sogge (p)

- 1972

Daryl Arenstein (1b)
Tim Steele (of)
Sam Ceci (c)
Russ McQueen^* (p)

- 1973

Rod Smalley* (ss)
Ken Huizenga (of)
Randy Scarbery (c)

- 1974

Rob Adolph (2b)
Rich Dauer (3b)
Marvin Cobb (ss)
Bob Mitchell (of)
George Milke^ (p)
Mark Barr (p)

- 1978

Dave Hostetler (1b)
Doug Stokke (ss)
Tim Tolman (if)
John Wells (cf)
Rod Boxberger^ (p)

- 1995

Geoff Jenkins* (of)
Randy Flores (p)
Wes Rachels (if)

- 1995

Rod Dedeaux~ Head Coach

- 1998

Robb Gorr (1b)
Jack Krawczyk (p)
Jason Lane (dh)
Eric Munson (c)
Wes Rachels^ (2b)
Brad Ticehurst (of)

Legend

- ^ denotes player was named MOP of the College World Series
- * denotes selection to College World Series All-Decade team
- ~ denotes selection to All-Time College World Series team

=== Johnny Bench Award ===
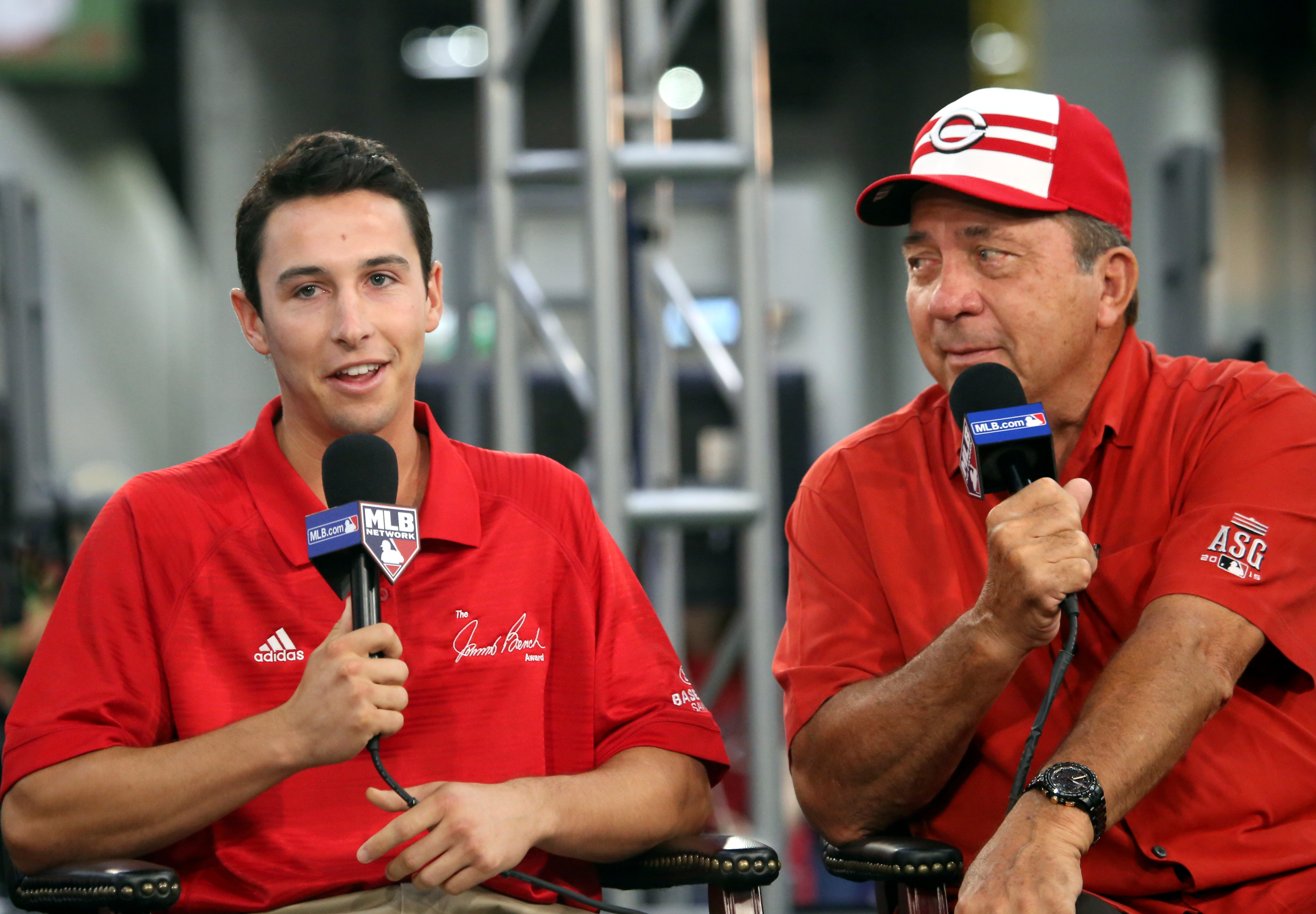
Garrett Stubbs (left) with Johnny Bench during the presentation of the Johnny Bench Award in 2015

- 2005: Jeff Clement
- 2015: Garrett Stubbs

== Notable players ==
- Brian Bannister
- Aaron Boone
- Bret Boone
- Don Buford
- Jeff Cirillo
- Ron Fairly
- Kent Hadley
- Geoff Jenkins
- Randy Johnson
- Jacque Jones
- Steve Kemp
- Dave Kingman
- Barry Latman
- Fred Lynn
- Mark McGwire
- Mark Prior
- Blake Sabol
- Tom Seaver
- Al Silvera
- Roy Smalley
- CJ Stubbs
- Garrett Stubbs
- Barry Zito

== See also ==
- List of NCAA Division I baseball programs
