= Dan Hubbs =

American baseball coach (born 1971)

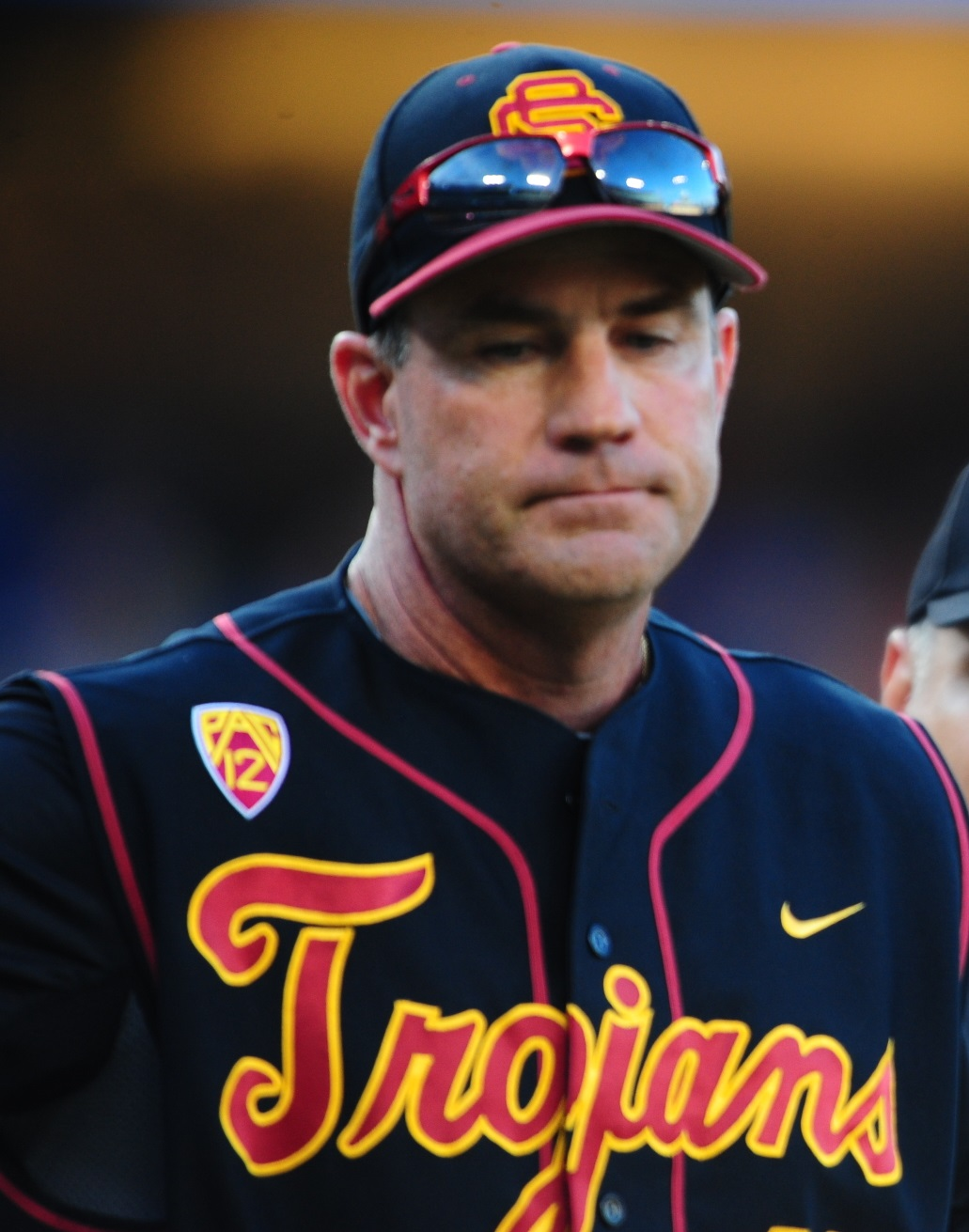
- Hubbs in 2015
- Born: January 23, 1971 (age 55); Bellevue, Washington, U.S.
- Coaching career

Playing career
- 1990–1993: USC
- Position: Pitcher

Coaching career (HC unless noted)
- 2000–2011: California (asst.)
- 2012: USC (asst.)
- 2013–2019: USC

Head coaching record
- Overall: 186–198–1 (.484)
- Tournaments: NCAA: 2–2
- Baseball career

Athletics – No. 71
- Bullpen coach
- Bats: Right Throws: Right
- Stats at Baseball Reference

Teams
- As coach: Oakland Athletics / Athletics (2023–present)

Daniel William Hubbs (born January 23, 1971) is an American baseball coach and former player. He currently serves as the pitching coach for the Athletics of Major League Baseball (MLB). He was formerly the head coach of the USC Trojans baseball team from 2013 to 2019.

== Playing career ==
Hubbs attended Kentridge High School in Kent, Washington, graduating in 1989. He played for the school's baseball team as a pitcher and had a 21–4 win–loss record, but broke his foot as a junior and had an elbow injury during his senior year.

Hubbs enrolled at the University of Southern California (USC) and made the USC Trojans baseball team as a walk-on. He played minor league baseball in the Los Angeles Dodgers and Philadelphia Phillies organizations.

== Coaching career ==
Hubbs worked as the pitching coach for the California Golden Bears from 2000 to 2011. He rejoined USC as an assistant coach in 2012.

On February 13, 2013, USC promoted Hubbs to head coach. He was dismissed on May 29, 2019.

Hubbs became the director of pitching development and strategies for the Detroit Tigers in 2020 and served in the role until 2021. In 2023, he became the Oakland Athletics' pitching development coach. After the 2023 season, he was named Oakland's bullpen coach.

On July 13, 2026, following the firing of Scott Emerson, Hubbs was named as the Athletics' interim pitching coach for the remainder of the season.

== Head coaching records ==
Below is a table of Hubbs's yearly records as an NCAA head baseball coach.

Record table
Season	Team	Overall	Conference	Standing	Postseason
USC Trojans (Pac-12 Conference) (2013–2019)
2013	USC	20–36	10–20	T–8th	
2014	USC	29–24	16–14	T–5th	
2015	USC	37–19	18–12	T–2nd	NCAA Regional
2016	USC	28–28	15–15	T–4th	
2017	USC	21–34	8–22	T–10th	
2018	USC	26–28	12–18	8th	
2019	USC	25–29–1	13–15–1	7th	
USC:		186–198–1 (.484)	92–116–1 (.443)		
Total:		186–198–1 (.484)			
