= Chad Kreuter =

American baseball player (born 1964)

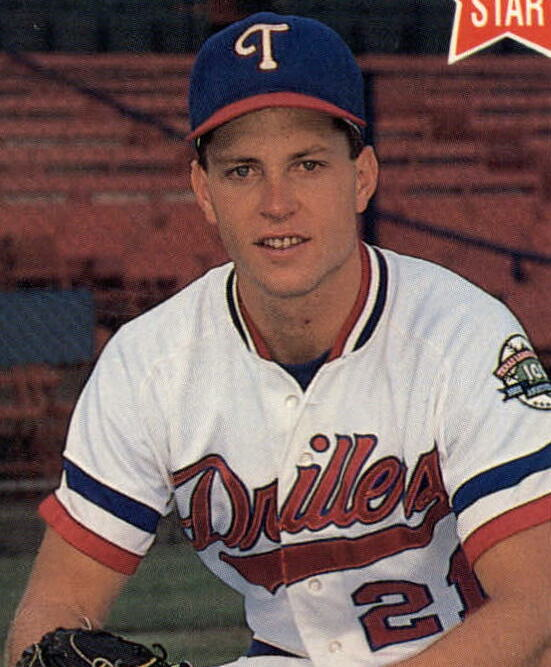
- Kreuter with the Tulsa Drillers c. 1988
- Catcher
- Born: August 26, 1964 (age 62); Greenbrae, California, U.S.
- Batted: Both Threw: Right

MLB debut
- September 14, 1988, for the Texas Rangers

Last MLB appearance
- April 27, 2003, for the Texas Rangers

MLB statistics
- Batting average: .237
- Home runs: 54
- Runs batted in: 274
- Stats at Baseball Reference

Teams
- Texas Rangers (1988–1991); Detroit Tigers (1992–1994); Seattle Mariners (1995); Chicago White Sox (1996–1997); Anaheim Angels (1997); Chicago White Sox (1998); Anaheim Angels (1998); Kansas City Royals (1999); Los Angeles Dodgers (2000–2002); Texas Rangers (2003)
Medals
Baseball
Representing the United States
Amateur World Series
Bronze medal – third place	1984 Cuba	Team

Chadden Michael Kreuter (/ˈkruːtər/; born August 26, 1964) is an American former professional baseball catcher and manager, and former college baseball head coach. He played in Major League Baseball (MLB) from 1988 to 2003 for seven different franchises. He later served as head coach of the USC Trojans baseball team, and was a manager in Minor League Baseball for the New York Mets organization.

== Playing career ==
Kreuter played for seven different ballclubs during his career: the Texas Rangers (1988–91, 2003), Detroit Tigers (1992–94), Seattle Mariners (1995), Chicago White Sox (1996–97, 1998), Anaheim Angels (1997–98), Kansas City Royals (1999) and Los Angeles Dodgers (2000–02). He made his major league debut on September 14, 1988, as the starting catcher wearing #7, and played his final game on April 27, 2003, as the starting catcher wearing #12.

Kreuter's best season was 1993 with the Tigers, when he batted .286 with 15 home runs and slugged .484, while appearing in a career high 119 games.

Kreuter's career included the unusual occurrence that he was traded from the White Sox to the Angels twice. The White Sox sent him along with Tony Phillips to the Angels on May 18, 1997, and after he signed back with the Sox as a free-agent in the off-season, they again sent him to Anaheim on September 18, 1998.

On May 16, 2000, Kreuter was involved in a brawl with fans at Wrigley Field in Chicago as he sat in the Dodgers bullpen along the right field foul line. During the 9th of inning of the game, a Cubs fan smacked the back of Kreuter's head and took his cap, prompting Kreuter and several other Dodgers to enter the stands and fight with fans. Kreuter and several other Dodgers were suspended eight games apiece, and a total of 19 players received fines. The Dodgers later settled a lawsuit with a fan who alleged that Kreuter choked him.

== Coaching career ==
Kreuter was named the coach of the USC Trojans on June 2, 2006, after former coach Mike Gillespie (who is also his father-in-law) retired. He was relieved as head coach on August 9, 2010, posting a 111–117 record in four years.

Kreuter was named as the manager for the St. Lucie Mets of the New York Mets organization for the 2018 season.

After two seasons of managing in St. Lucie, he was named as the manager of the Syracuse Mets on February 8, 2020.

On January 18, 2022, Kreuter was hired as bench coach for the Acereros de Monclova of the Mexican League. He was fired on May 30, 2022, along with manager Mickey Callaway and quality coach Nick Leyva.
