= 2017 West Coast Conference baseball tournament =

- Teams: 4
- Format: Double-elimination
- Finals site: Banner Island Ballpark; Stockton, CA
- Champions: BYU (1st title)
- Winning coach: Mike Littlewood (1st title)
- MVP: Bronson Larsen (BYU)
- Television: TheW.tv, Twitter

2017 West Coast Conference baseball standings
| | Conf. | | | | | | Overall |
| Team | W | | L | | T | PCT | W | | L | | T | PCT |
|---|---|---|---|---|---|---|---|---|---|---|---|---|
| Gonzaga ‍†‍‍ | 20 | – | 7 | – | 0 | .741 | 33 | – | 20 | – | 0 | .623 |
| BYU ‍†‍‡‍^{y} | 20 | – | 7 | – | 0 | .741 | 38 | – | 21 | – | 0 | .644 |
| Loyola Marymount ^{†} ‍‍‍ | 20 | – | 7 | – | 0 | .741 | 38 | – | 18 | – | 0 | .679 |
| Saint Mary's ‍‍‍ | 18 | – | 9 | – | 0 | .667 | 37 | – | 20 | – | 0 | .649 |
| San Diego ‍‍‍ | 18 | – | 9 | – | 0 | .667 | 35 | – | 18 | – | 1 | .657 |
| San Francisco ‍‍‍ | 11 | – | 16 | – | 0 | .407 | 29 | – | 28 | – | 0 | .509 |
| Santa Clara ‍‍‍ | 9 | – | 18 | – | 0 | .333 | 13 | – | 40 | – | 0 | .245 |
| Pepperdine ‍‍‍ | 8 | – | 19 | – | 0 | .296 | 20 | – | 32 | – | 0 | .385 |
| Pacific ‍‍‍ | 6 | – | 21 | – | 0 | .222 | 18 | – | 35 | – | 0 | .340 |
| Portland ‍‍‍ | 5 | – | 22 | – | 0 | .185 | 10 | – | 41 | – | 1 | .202 |
† – Conference champion ‡ – Tournament champion y – Invited to the NCAA tournament Rankings from Collegiate Baseball

The 2017 West Coast Conference baseball tournament was held from May 25 through 27, 2017 at Banner Island Ballpark in Stockton, California. BYU won the four team, double-elimination tournament and earned the league's automatic bid to the 2017 NCAA Division I baseball tournament.

== Seeding ==
The top four finishers from the regular season were seeded one through four based on conference winning percentage. The teams then played a double elimination tournament.

| Team | W | L | Pct. | GB | Seed |
|---|---|---|---|---|---|
| Gonzaga | 20 | 7 | .741 | — | 1 |
| Loyola Marymount | 20 | 7 | .741 | — | 2 |
| BYU | 20 | 7 | .741 | — | 3 |
| Saint Mary's | 18 | 9 | .667 | 2 | 4 |
| San Diego | 18 | 9 | .667 | 2 | — |
| San Francisco | 11 | 16 | .519 | 9 | — |
| Santa Clara | 9 | 18 | .370 | 11 | — |
| Pepperdine | 8 | 19 | .593 | 12 | — |
| Pacific | 6 | 21 | .444 | 14 | — |
| Portland | 5 | 22 | .259 | 15 | — |

Tiebreakers:

- Gonzaga went 3–0 against BYU and 2–1 against Loyola Marymount to earn the top seed.
- Loyola Marymount went 2–1 against BYU to earn the second seed.
- BYU went 1–2 against LMU and 0–3 against Gonzaga to earn the third seed.
- Saint Mary's went 2–1 against San Diego to earn the fourth seed.

== Results ==
First round
1 | Gonzaga | 11
4 | Saint Mary's | 3
2 | Loyola Marymount | 3
3 | BYU | 2
Lower round 1
4 | Saint Mary's | 4
3 | BYU | 8

Semi-finals
1 | Gonzaga | 3
2 | Loyola Marymount | 1
Lower final
3 | BYU | 5
2 | Loyola Marymount | 4

Finals
1 | Gonzaga
3 | BYU

== All-Tournament Team ==
The following players were named to the All-Tournament Team.

| Pos | Player | Class | School |
|---|---|---|---|
| P | Cory Abbott | Jr | Loyola Marymount |
| P | Maverik Buffo | Jr | BYU |
| P | Codie Paiva | So | Loyola Marymount |
| P | Justin Vernia | Sr | Gonzaga |
| C | Bronson Larsen | Sr | BYU |
| C | Jake Roberts | Sr | Gonzaga |
| IF | Daniel Schneemann | So | BYU |
| OF | Tyler Frost | Jr | Gonzaga |
| OF | Brock Hale | So | BYU |
| OF | Brett Rasso | Jr | Saint Mary’s |

=== Most Outstanding Player ===
Bronson Larsen, a senior catcher at BYU, was named Tournament Most Outstanding Player.
