= List of Big West Conference baseball champions =

This is a list of Big West Conference champions in college baseball. The Big West Conference is composed of eleven schools which participate in baseball, with each school playing all of the others in three game series. The team with the best record is named champion, and wins the league's automatic bid to the NCAA Division I Baseball Championship.

The conference began sponsoring baseball under the name Pacific Coast Athletic Association in 1970 and crowned a champion each year through 1976. Beginning in 1977, the league joined with the West Coast Conference for baseball, with competition in two separate conferences - the Northern California Baseball Association and the Southern California Baseball Association. This arrangement lasted through the 1984 season, when the league once again began sponsoring baseball for its members. In 1988, the conference adopted the Big West name. In 1990, the league held a divisional playoff, and in 1997 and 1998, the league held a tournament to determine its champion. in 2025, the league is bringing back a tournament to determine its champion.

== Champions ==
=== Pacific Coast Athletic Association ===
Year	Regular Season Champion	Record
1970	No. 23 Long Beach State	11–4
1971	No. 21 San Jose State; Fresno State	13–8
1972	No. 17 UC Santa Barbara	14–4
1973	Cal State Los Angeles	13–5
1974	No. 12 Cal State Los Angeles	18–5
1975	No. 8 Cal State Fullerton	14–7
1976	No. 26 Cal State Fullerton	17–4

=== Northern California Baseball Association ===
Year	Champion	Record
1977	No. 21 Fresno State	26–10
1978	Santa Clara	23–8
1979	No. 26 Fresno State	23–13
1980	No. 24 Fresno State	31–3
1981	No. 20 Fresno State	26–10
1982	No. 13 Fresno State; Santa Clara	30–6; 26–10
1983	No. 11 Fresno State	22–8
1984	No. 14 Fresno State	28–2

=== Southern California Baseball Association ===
Year	Champion	Record
1977	No. 20 Cal State Fullerton; No. 4 Cal State Los Angeles	17–7
1978	No. 21 Cal State Fullerton	24–4
1979	No. 1 Cal State Fullerton	23–4
1980	No. 23 Cal State Fullerton	20–8
1981	No. 9 Cal State Fullerton	22–6
1982	No. 8 Cal State Fullerton	23–5
1983	No. 20 Cal State Fullerton; No. 13 UC Santa Barbara	22–6
1984	No. 1 Cal State Fullerton	22–6

=== Pacific Coast Athletic Association/Big West Conference ===
Year	Regular season champion	Record	Postseason champion
1985	No. 12 Fresno State (North); Cal State Fullerton (South)	23–7; 21–9	Fresno State def. Cal State Fullerton (2–0); 1985 Pacific Coast Athletic Association Baseball Championship Series
1986	No. 9 UC Santa Barbara	18–3	
1987	No. 7 Cal State Fullerton	18–3	
1988	No. 7 Fresno State	20–1	
1989	No. 8 Long Beach State; No. 12 Fresno State	17–4	
1990	No. 28 Fresno State; No. 9 Cal State Fullerton	13–5	
1991	No. 6 Fresno State; Cal State Fullerton	15–6	
1992	No. 23 Long Beach State	18–5	
1993	No. 3 Long Beach State	17–4	
1994	No. 19 Nevada; No. 20 Long Beach State; No. 3 Cal State Fullerton	16–5; 16–5; 15–5	
1995	No. 1 Cal State Fullerton	18–3	(1) Cal State Fullerton def. (2) Long Beach State 8–4; 1995 Big West Conference baseball tournament
1996	Long Beach State	15–6	(2) UNLV def. (1) Long Beach State 11–2; 1996 Big West Conference baseball tournament
1997	Nevada (North); No. 24 Long Beach State/No. 21 Cal State Fullerton (South)	20–10; 22–8	(3) Cal State Fullerton def. (1) Long Beach State 7–2, 15–6; 1997 Big West Conference baseball tournament
1998	Nevada (North); No. 11 Cal State Fullerton (South)	17–10; 25–5	(3) Long Beach State def. (4) Sacramento State 24–10; 1998 Big West Conference baseball tournament
1999	No. 6 Cal State Fullerton	25–5	
2000	Nevada; No. 22 Cal State Fullerton	21–9	
2001	No. 3 Cal State Fullerton	14–4	
2002	No. 28 Cal State Fullerton	19–5	
2003	No. 11 Long Beach State	16–5	
2004	No. 1 Cal State Fullerton	19–2	
2005	No. 9 Cal State Fullerton	16–5	
2006	No. 4 Cal State Fullerton	18–3	
2007	No. 7 UC Riverside	16–5	
2008	No. 11 Cal State Fullerton; No. 19 Long Beach State	16–8	
2009	No. 9 UC Irvine	22–2	
2010	No. 12 Cal State Fullerton	21–3	
2011	No. 18 Cal State Fullerton	19–5	
2012	No. 19 Cal State Fullerton	17–7	
2013	No. 10 Cal State Fullerton	23–4	
2014	No. 19 Cal Poly	19–5	
2015	No. 6 Cal State Fullerton	19–5	
2016	No. 28 Cal State Fullerton	17–7	
2017	No. 9 Long Beach State	20–4	
2018	Cal State Fullerton	18–6	
2019	UC Santa Barbara	19–5	
2020	Season cancelled in March due to the coronavirus pandemic		
2021	No. 17 UC Irvine	32–8	
2022	No. 17 UC Santa Barbara	27–3	
2023	UC San Diego	21–9	
2024	No. 19 UC Santa Barbara	26–4	
2025	No. 25 UC Irvine	24–6	(2) Cal Poly def. (1) UC Irvine 15–5 (8), 6–4; 2025 Big West Conference baseball tournament
2026	Cal Poly; UC Santa Barbara	22–8	(2) Cal Poly def. (3) UC San Diego 2–12, 4–3; 2026 Big West Conference baseball tournament
