= 2025 UC Irvine Anteaters baseball team =

American college baseball season

2025 UC Irvine Anteaters baseball

Big West regular season champions

Los Angeles Regional, 2-2
- Conference: Big West Conference

Ranking
- Coaches: No. 23
- D1Baseball.com: No. 25
- Record: 43–17 (24–6 Big West)
- Head coach: Ben Orloff (7th season)
- Assistant coaches: Ryan Johnston (3rd season); Erich Pfohl (2nd season); CJ Yogi (2nd season)
- Hitting coach: J.T. Bloodworth (6th season)
- Pitching coach: Daniel Bibona (12th season)
- MVP: Colin Yeaman
- Home stadium: Cicerone Field

2025 Big West Conference baseball standings
	Conf.						Overall
Team	W		L		T	PCT	W		L		T	PCT
No. 25 UC Irvine ‍†‍‍^{y}	24	–	6	–	0	.800	43	–	17	–	0	.717
Cal Poly ‍‍‡‍^{y}	23	–	7	–	0	.767	43	–	19	–	0	.694
Cal State Fullerton ‍‍‍	19	–	11	–	0	.633	29	–	27	–	0	.518
UC Santa Barbara ‍‍‍	16	–	14	–	0	.533	36	–	18	–	0	.667
Hawai'i ‍‍‍	16	–	14	–	0	.533	35	–	21	–	0	.625
UC San Diego ‍‍‍	15	–	15	–	0	.500	26	–	25	–	0	.510
Long Beach State ‍‍‍	15	–	15	–	0	.500	22	–	31	–	0	.415
UC Davis ‍‍‍	13	–	17	–	0	.433	27	–	28	–	0	.491
CSUN ‍‍‍	10	–	20	–	0	.333	15	–	34	–	0	.306
Cal State Bakersfield ‍‍‍	9	–	21	–	0	.300	18	–	38	–	0	.321
UC Riverside ‍‍‍	5	–	25	–	0	.167	16	–	36	–	0	.308
† – Conference champion ‡ – Tournament champion y – Invited to the NCAA tournament As of June 23, 2025; Rankings from D1Baseball

The 2025 UC Irvine Anteaters baseball team represented the University of California, Irvine during the 2025 NCAA Division I baseball season. The Anteaters played their home games at Cicerone Field as a member of the Big West Conference. They were led by head coach Ben Orloff in his seventh season as manager. This was the first year since 1998 the Big West Conference had a postseason tournament, and the Anteaters finished as the runner-up, falling to Cal Poly back-to-back. The Anteaters were one of four mid-major teams to receive an at-large bid, where they were subsequently placed in the Los Angeles regional, hosted by UCLA. They ended up losing in the regional final to UCLA 5–8, failing to improve upon their 2024 record. They finished the season ranked 25th by D1Baseball.com and 23rd by the USA Today Coaches Poll.

== Previous season ==
Last season, UC Irvine finished with a 45–14 record, going 22–8 in the Big West, and finishing second in the conference. They received an at-large bid to the 2024 NCAA Division I Baseball Tournament, along with conference champion UC Santa Barbara. The Anteaters went 2-2, falling to Oregon State in the regional finals 11–6. UC Irvine finished the season ranked 23rd in the nation by D1Baseball.com and 25th by the USA Today Coaches Poll.

== Preseason ==
=== Big West Coaches' Poll ===
The Big West Coaches' Poll was released on February 7, 2025. This is the fourth season in a row UC Irvine is predicted to finish second in the conference.

Coaches' Poll
Pos.	Team	Points
1	UC Santa Barbara	99 (9)
2	UC Irvine	89 (2)
3	Cal Poly	79
4	Hawai'i	76
5	UC San Diego	73
6	CSUN	50
7	UC Davis	47
T8	Cal State Fullerton	36
T8	Long Beach State	36
10	Cal State Bakersfield	18
11	UC Riverside	12

== Personnel ==
=== Starters ===
Lineup
Pos.	No.	Player.	Year
C	40	Blake Penso	Senior
1B	5	James Castagnola	RS-Sophomore
2B	16	Will Bermudez	RS-Senior
3B	36	Zach Fjelstad	Sophomore
SS	34	Colin Yeaman	Junior
LF	9	Rowan Felsch	Junior
CF	8	Jacob McCombs	Sophomore
RF	26	Chase Call	Senior
DH	55	Anthony Martinez	Junior

Weekend pitching rotation
Day	No.	Player.	Year
Friday	14	Danny Suarez	RS-Junior
Saturday	2	Jack Ross	Junior
Sunday	28	Trevor Hansen	Sophomore

=== Roster ===
2025 UC Irvine Anteaters baseball team
Players
Coaches

#	Pos.	Name	B/T	Height	Weight	Year	Home town
1	INF	Ryan Castro	R/R	6 ft 0 in (1.83 m)	195 lb (88 kg)	Fr	San Dimas, CA
2	RHP	Jack Ross	R/R	6 ft 3 in (1.91 m)	200 lb (91 kg)	Jr	Huntington Beach, CA
4	INF	Andrew Grove	R/R	6 ft 3 in (1.91 m)	210 lb (95 kg)	RS Fr	Orange, CA
5	INF	James Castagnola	R/R	6 ft 1 in (1.85 m)	195 lb (88 kg)	RS So	San Diego, CA
8	OF	Jacob McCombs	L/R	6 ft 2 in (1.88 m)	200 lb (91 kg)	So	Rancho Cucamonga, CA
9	OF	Rowan Felsch	L/L	6 ft 2 in (1.88 m)	200 lb (91 kg)	Jr	Palo Alto, CA
10	OF	Zach Doyle	L/L	5 ft 10 in (1.78 m)	175 lb (79 kg)	Fr	Ladera Ranch, CA
11	RHP	Max Martin	R/R	6 ft 5 in (1.96 m)	195 lb (88 kg)	Jr	Northridge, CA
12	RHP	David Utagawa	R/R	6 ft 4 in (1.93 m)	235 lb (107 kg)	RS Sr	Phoenix, AZ
13	LHP	Ricky Ojeda	L/L	5 ft 11 in (1.8 m)	185 lb (84 kg)	So	Valencia, CA
14	RHP	Danny Suarez	R/R	6 ft 3 in (1.91 m)	210 lb (95 kg)	RS Jr	Trabuco Canyon, CA
15	RHP	Finnegan Wall	R/R	6 ft 2 in (1.88 m)	205 lb (93 kg)	RS Jr	Hesperia, CA
16	INF	Will Bermudez	S/R	5 ft 10 in (1.78 m)	185 lb (84 kg)	RS Sr	Whittier, CA
17	RHP	Riley Kelly	R/R	6 ft 5 in (1.96 m)	240 lb (109 kg)	RS So	Santa Ana, CA
18	C	Zach Crandall	R/R	5 ft 10 in (1.78 m)	210 lb (95 kg)	RS Jr	Rancho Santa Margarita, CA
20	RHP	Tim Grack	R/R	6 ft 1 in (1.85 m)	195 lb (88 kg)	So	Fountain Valley, CA
21	INF	Landon Gaz	R/R	6 ft 2 in (1.88 m)	235 lb (107 kg)	So	Moorpark, CA
22	RHP	David Butler	R/R	6 ft 1 in (1.85 m)	185 lb (84 kg)	Sr	Riverside, CA
23	INF	Frankie Carney	L/R	5 ft 10 in (1.78 m)	180 lb (82 kg)	RS So	San Diego, CA
24	INF	Auggie Gutierrez	R/R	5 ft 11 in (1.8 m)	190 lb (86 kg)	Jr	Yorba Linda, CA
25	UTL	Alonso Reyes	L/R	5 ft 10 in (1.78 m)	180 lb (82 kg)	So	Inglewood, CA
26	OF	Chase Call	R/R	6 ft 2 in (1.88 m)	215 lb (98 kg)	Sr	Porter Ranch, CA
27	LHP	Brandon Luu	L/L	6 ft 2 in (1.88 m)	205 lb (93 kg)	So	Irvine, CA
28	RHP	Trevor Hansen	R/R	6 ft 2 in (1.88 m)	195 lb (88 kg)	So	Simi Valley, CA
30	OF	Ryan Kysar	R/R	6 ft 0 in (1.83 m)	195 lb (88 kg)	RS Sr	Valencia, CA
31	RHP	Matthew Krause	R/R	6 ft 0 in (1.83 m)	190 lb (86 kg)	Fr	Redondo Beach, CA
32	OF	Davis D'Errico	R/R	5 ft 10 in (1.78 m)	190 lb (86 kg)	RS Fr	Los Alamitos, CA
33	RHP	Tyler Foster	R/R	6 ft 1 in (1.85 m)	190 lb (86 kg)	Fr	Carlsbad, CA
34	INF	Colin Yeaman	R/R	6 ft 2 in (1.88 m)	200 lb (91 kg)	Jr	Saugus, CA
35	OF	Hudson Comer	R/R	6 ft 2 in (1.88 m)	210 lb (95 kg)	Fr	El Segundo, CA
36	INF	Zach Fjelstad	L/R	5 ft 11 in (1.8 m)	190 lb (86 kg)	So	Coto de Caza, CA
37	INF	Ryan Ham	R/R	6 ft 0 in (1.83 m)	185 lb (84 kg)	Fr	Scripps Ranch, CA
38	LHP	Dane Grant	L/L	6 ft 1 in (1.85 m)	185 lb (84 kg)	Fr	San Juan Capistrano, CA
40	C	Blake Penso	R/R	6 ft 3 in (1.91 m)	225 lb (102 kg)	Sr	Huntington Beach, CA
42	LHP	Ryder Brooks	L/L	6 ft 3 in (1.91 m)	200 lb (91 kg)	RS So	Fountain Valley, CA
43	C	Michael Podstreleny	L/R	5 ft 10 in (1.78 m)	190 lb (86 kg)	Fr	San Diego, CA
44	INF	Theo Kim	S/R	6 ft 2 in (1.88 m)	200 lb (91 kg)	Fr	Rancho Bernardo, CA
45	LHP	Jaxton Andeel	L/L	6 ft 4 in (1.93 m)	210 lb (95 kg)	Jr	Placentia, CA
52	RHP	Aidan Alvarez	R/R	6 ft 3 in (1.91 m)	200 lb (91 kg)	Fr	Yorba Linda, CA
55	INF	Anthony Martinez	L/R	6 ft 3 in (1.91 m)	230 lb (104 kg)	Jr	Fairfield, CA

Head coach

Ben Orloff

Assistant coach(es)

Daniel Bibona
J.T. Bloodworth
Ryan Johnston

Legend

- (C) Team captain
- (S) Suspended
- (I) Ineligible
- Injured
- Current redshirt

Roster
Last update: Feb 4, 2025

== Schedule ==
Legend
	Anteaters win
	Anteaters loss
	Postponement
**Bold**	Anteaters team member

2025 UC Irvine Anteaters baseball game log (43–17)
Regular season (39–13)

February (6–3)
Date	TV	Opponent	Rank	Stadium	Score	Win	Loss	Save	Attendance	Overall	BWC
MLB Desert Invitational
February 14	MLBN	vs. No. 24 Nebraska*	-	Salt River Fields at Talking Stick; Scottsdale, Arizona	10–5	**Ojeda (1–0)**	McConnaughey (0–1)	None	1,300	1–0	–
February 15	MLBN	New Mexico*	-	Sloan Park; Mesa, Arizona	18–4	**Ross (1–0)**	Lopez (0–1)	None	545	2–0	—
February 16	MLB.com	vs. No. 16 Vanderbilt*	-	Sloan Park	8–9	O'Rourke (1–0)	**Butler (0–1)**	Green (2)	825	2–1	—
February 18	ESPN+	USC*	-	Cicerone Field; Irvine, California	2-5	Govel (1–0)	**Brooks (0–1)**	None	1,239	2-2	—
February 21	ESPN+	at Texas Tech*	-	Dan Law Field at Rip Griffin Park; Lubbock, Texas	6-4	**Kelly (1–0)**	Heuer (0–1)	**Ojeda (1)**	3,284	3-2	—
February 22	ESPN+	Texas Tech*	-	Dan Law Field at Rip Griffin Park	12-15	Crotchfelt (1–0)	**Ross (0–1)**	Parish (1)	3,909	3-3	—
February 23	ESPN+	Texas Tech*	-	Dan Law Field at Rip Griffin Park	11-10	**Martin (1–0)**	Drake (0–1)	**Butler (1)**	3,894	4-3	—
February 26	ESPN+	Utah Tech*	-	Cicerone Field	8-4	**Brooks (1-1)**	Newman (0–1)	None	762	5-3	—
February 28	ESPN+	Louisiana*	-	Cicerone Field	7-4	**Ojeda (2–0)**	Holzhammer (0–1)	**Martin (1)**	742	6-3	—

March (15–2)
Date	TV	Opponent	Rank	Stadium	Score	Win	Loss	Save	Attendance	Overall	BWC
March 1	ESPN+	Louisiana*	-	Cicerone Field	9-6	**Ross (2–1)**	McGehee (1–2)	**Martin (2)**	650	7-3	—
March 2	ESPN+	Louisiana*	-	Cicerone Field	12-5	**Hansen (1–0)**	Herrmann (1-1)	None	792	8-3	—
March 4	ESPN+	at San Diego*	-	Fowler Park; San Diego, California	12-3	**Brooks (2–1)**	Harrison (1–2)	None	282	9-3	—
March 7	ESPN+	Long Beach State	-	Cicerone Field	8-10	Montgomery (4–0)	**Suarez (0–1)**	Roblez (1)	821	9-4	0–1
March 8	ESPN+	Long Beach State	-	Cicerone Field	8-6	**Kelly (2–0)**	Geiss (1–4)	**Martin (3)**	782	10-4	1-1
March 9	ESPN+	Long Beach State	-	Cicerone Field	10-1	**Hansen (2–0)**	Kahalekai (0–3)	None	1,117	11-4	2–1
March 11	B1G+	at UCLA*	-	Jackie Robinson Field; Pasadena, California	4-11	May (2–1)	**Kysar (0–1)**	None	317	11-5	—
March 14	ESPN+	at CSUN	-	Matador Field; Northridge, California	Rescheduled for March 15 Doubleheader **(Inclement Weather)**					11-5	—
March 15 (DH 1)	-	at CSUN	-	Matador Field	11-3	**Ojeda (3–0)**	Halamicek (0–3)	None	354	12-5	3–1
March 15 (DH 2)	-	at CSUN	-	Matador Field	15-2	**Hansen (3–0)**	Rinehart (0–2)	None	354	13-5	4–1
March 16	ESPN+	at CSUN	-	Matador Field	6-2	**Butler (1-1)**	Gutierrez (1–2)	**Martin (4)**	342	14-5	5–1
March 21	ESPN+	at No. 21 UCSB	-	Caesar Uyesaka Stadium; Santa Barbara, California	10–0	**Kelly (3–0)**	Bremner (2–1)	None	997	15–5	6–1
March 22	ESPN+	at No. 21 UCSB	-	Caesar Uyesaka Stadium	9-3	**Hansen (4–0)**	Flora (1–2)	**Martin (5)**	874	16-5	7–1
March 23	ESPN+	at No. 21 UCSB	-	Caesar Uyesaka Stadium	9–4	**Ojeda (4–0)**	Proskey (1–3)	**Martin (6)**	698	17–5	8–1
March 25	B1G+	at USC*	No. 19	George C. Page Stadium; Los Angeles, California	12-9	**Kysar (1-1)**	Osborne (0–1)	**Butler (2)**	422	18-5	—
March 28	ESPN+	UC Riverside	No. 19	Cicerone Field	20-1	**Kelly (4–0)**	Milliman (2–1)	None	754	19-5	9–1
March 29	ESPN+	UC Riverside	No. 19	Cicerone Field	14-8	**Hansen (5–0)**	Flores (2–3)	None	739	20-5	10–1
March 30	ESPN+	UC Riverside	No. 19	Cicerone Field	7-4	**Brooks (3–1)**	Martinez (1-1)	**Max (7)**	926	21-5	11–1

April (12–4)
Date	TV	Opponent	Rank	Stadium	Score	Win	Loss	Save	Attendance	Overall	BWC
April 1	ESPN+	San Diego*	No. 12	Cicerone Field	16–7	**Ojeda (5–0)**	Giordano (0–2)	None	646	22–5	—
April 4	Portland's CW	at No. 11 Oregon State*	No. 12	Goss Stadium	12-0	**Ojeda (6–0)**	Keljo (2–1)	None	4,012	23-5	—
April 5	Portland's CW	at No. 11 Oregon State*	No. 12	Goss Stadium	2-4	Hutcheson (1–0)	**Butler (1–2)**	None	4,066	23-6	—
April 6	Portland's CW	at No. 11 Oregon State*	No. 12	Goss Stadium	4-7	Kleinschmit (5–1)	**Brooks (3–2)**	Oakes (1)	3,908	23-7	—
April 11	-	at UC Davis	No. 13	UC Davis Health Stadium; Davis, California	4–1	**Ojeda** (7–0)	Green (2–3)	**Martin** (8)	352	24–7	12–1
April 12	-	at UC Davis	No. 13	UC Davis Health Stadium	3–7	Valdez (4–3)	**Butler** (1–3)	None	637	24–8	12–2
April 13	ESPN+	at UC Davis	No. 13	UC Davis Health Stadium	13-2	**Brooks (4–2)**	Barnes II (0–1)	None	600	25-8	13–2
April 15	ESPN+	Loyola Marymount*	No. 13	Cicerone Field	5–15	Behrens (3–0)	**Ross** (2–2)	None	745	25–9	—
April 17	ESPN+	Hawaii	No. 13	Cicerone Field	3-1	**Ojeda (8–0)**	Ronan (1–2)	**Martin (9)**	733	26-9	14–2
April 18	ESPN+	Hawaii	No. 13	Cicerone Field	4-0	**Hansen (6–0)**	Adamson (0–1)	None	1,170	27-9	15–2
April 19	ESPN+	Hawaii	No. 13	Cicerone Field	5-0	**Brooks (5–2)**	Walls (2–3)	None	1,089	28-9	16–2
April 22	ESPN+	No. 15 UCLA*	No. 12	Cicerone Field	5–3	**Ojeda (9–0)**	Hepp (0–1)	None	1,727	29–9	—
April 25	ESPN+	at Cal Poly	No. 12	Baggett Stadium; San Luis Obispo, California	6–4	**Ojeda (10–0)**	Torres (2–3)	None	2,492	30–9	17–2
April 26	ESPN+	at Cal Poly	No. 12	Baggett Stadium	4-0	**Hansen (7–0)**	Volmerding (4–3)	None	2,782	31-9	18–2
April 27	ESPN+	at Cal Poly	No. 12	Baggett Stadium	10–8	**Ojeda (11–0)**	Torres (2–4)	None	2,026	32–9	19–2
April 29	-	vs. Cal State Fullerton*	No. 8	Angel Stadium; Anaheim, California	5–1	**Ross (3–2)**	Hawkinson (1–3)	None	1,863	33–9	-

May (6–4)
Date	TV	Opponent	Rank	Stadium	Score	Win	Loss	Save	Attendance	Overall	BWC
May 2	ESPN+	UC San Diego	No. 8	Cicerone Field	4–19	Dalquist (6–4)	**Kelly** (4–1)	None	1,005	33–10	19–3
May 3	ESPN+	UC San Diego	No. 8	Cicerone Field	0–4	Gregson (2–1)	**Hansen** (7–1)	Seid (3)	891	33–11	19–4
May 4	ESPN+	UC San Diego	No. 8	Cicerone Field	8–4	**Ojeda** (12–0)	Murdock (0–3)	None	982	34–11	20–4
May 6	ESPN+	at Cal Baptist*	No. 13	James W. Totman Stadium; Riverside, California	9–8	**Utagawa** (1–0)	Orozco (2–3)	**Meyer** (10)	480	35–11	—
May 9	ESPN+	at Cal State Bakersfield	No. 13	Hardt Field; Bakersfield, California	14–11	**Butler** (2–3)	King (0–5)	**Ojeda** (2)	306	36–11	21–4
May 10	ESPN+	at Cal State Bakersfield	No. 13	Hardt Field	7–3	**Hansen** (8–1)	McAlinden (1–7)	**Martin** (11)	237	37–11	22–4
May 11	ESPN+	at Cal State Bakersfield	No. 13	Hardt Field	5-3	**Brooks** (6–2)	Gutierrez (3–6)	**Martin** (12)	205	38-11	23–4
May 15	ESPN+	Cal State Fullerton	No. 12	Cicerone Field	7–9	Wright (3–2)	**Martin** (1–1)	None	959	38–12	23–5
May 16	ESPN+	Cal State Fullerton	No. 12	Cicerone Field	2–4	Harper (3–0)	**Hansen** (8–2)	Wright (10)	1,423	38–13	23–6
May 17	ESPN+	Cal State Fullerton	No. 12	Cicerone Field	12-10	**Suarez** (1-1)	Gurnea (0–2)	**Martin** (13)	987	39-13	24–6

Postseason (4–4)

Big West tournament (2–2)
Date	TV	Opponent	Rank	Stadium	Score	Win	Loss	Save	Attendance	Overall	BWCT Record	Source
May 22	ESPN+	Hawai'i (4); Round 2	No. 20 (1)	Goodwin Field; Fullerton, California	7-5	**Ojeda** (13–0)	Takemoto (2–6)	**Martin** (14)	554	40-13	1-0	
May 23	ESPN+	Cal Poly (2); Upper Finals	No. 20 (1)	Goodwin Field	15-3 (7)	**Hansen** (9–2)	Volmerding (5-5)	None	752	41-13	2-0	
May 24	ESPN+	Cal Poly (2); Finals	No. 20 (1)	Goodwin Field	5-15 (8)	Downs (6–0)	**Brooks (6–3)**	None	1,006	41-14	2-1	
May 25	ESPN+	Cal Poly (2); Finals	No. 20 (1)	Goodwin Field	4-6	Sagouspe (4–2)	**Ojeda** (13–1)	None	763	41-15	2-2	

NCAA Regionals (2-2)
Date	TV	Opponent	Rank	Stadium	Score	Win	Loss	Save	Attendance	Overall	NCAA Tournament Record
May 30	ESPN2	Arizona State (3)	No. 23	Jackie Robinson Field; Pasadena, California	2-4	Jacobs (4–3)	**Hansen** (9–3)	Carlon (4)	1,034	41-16	0–1
May 31	ESPN+	Fresno State (4)	No. 23	Jackie Robinson Field	8-3	**Utagawa** (2–0)	Cremarosa (6-6)	None	725	42-16	1-1
June 1	ESPN+	Arizona State (3)	No. 23	Jackie Robinson Field	11-6	**Brooks** (7–3)	Schaefer (3–1)	None	704	43-16	2–1
June 1	ESPN+	No. 13 UCLA (1); Regional Finals	No. 23	Jackie Robinson Field	5-8	Grothues (3–1)	**Wall** (0–1)	Hawk (1)	1,070	43-17	2-2
*Non-conference game. ^{#}Rankings from D1Baseball. (#) Tournament seedings in parentheses. All times are in Pacific.

== 2025 MLB draft ==
Round	Pick	Player	Position	MLB Team
#4	#107	Riley Kelly	RHP	Colorado Rockies
#4	#124	Colin Yeaman	SS	Baltimore Orioles
#7	#209	Jacob McCombs	OF	Minnesota Twins
#8	#252	Anthony Martinez	1B	Cleveland Guardians
#10	#308	Max Martin	RHP	Kansas City Royals
#11	#326	Junior Barajas	C	San Francisco Giants
#16	#486	Chase Call	OF	Houston Astros

== Awards ==
=== Preseason ===
==== National team ====
Preseason College Baseball All-American Third Team
Player	No.	Position	Class
Anthony Martinez	55	1B	Junior

==== Preseason All-Big West Team ====
Preseason All-Big West Team
Player	No.	Position	Class
Anthony Martinez	55	1B	Junior
Ricky Ojeda	13	LHP	Sophomore

=== Regular season ===
==== National Awards ====
National Pitcher of the Year Weekly Awards
Player	No.	Position	Class	Date
Ryder Brooks	42	LHP	RS Sophomore	April 22, 2025
Trevor Hansen	28	RHP	Sophomore	April 22, 2025

==== Big West Weekly Awards ====
Big West Weekly Athlete Awards
Player	No.	Position	Class	Award Name	Date
Jacob McCombs	08	OF	Sophomore	Field Player of the Week	February 24, 2025
Anthony Martinez	55	INF	Junior	Field Player of the Week	March 10, 2025
Ricky Ojeda	13	LHP	Sophomore	Pitcher of the Week	March 24, 2025
Colin Yeaman	34	INF	Junior	Field Player of the Week	March 24, 2025
Chase Call	26	OF	Senior	Field Player of the Week	April 28, 2025
Blake Penso	40	C	Senior	Field Player of the Week	May 12, 2025

=== Postseason ===
==== National team ====
Perfect Game All-American Third Team
Player	No.	Position	Class
Ricky Ojeda	13	LHP	Sophomore

==== Regional Teams ====
ABCA/Rawlings All-West Region
Player	No.	Position	Class
Trevor Hansen	28	RHP	Sophomore
Max Martin	11	RHP	Junior
Jacob McCombs	08	OF	Sophomore
Ricky Ojeda	13	LHP	Sophomore

Los Angeles Regional All-Tournament Team
Player	No.	Position	Class
Chase Call	26	OF	Senior
Jacob McCombs	08	OF	Sophomore
Ricky Ojeda	13	LHP	Sophomore
Alonso Reyes	25	DH	Sophomore

==== Big West Teams and Awards ====
Big West All-Tournament Team
Player	No.	Position	Class
Trevor Hansen	28	RHP	Sophomore
Jacob McCombs	08	OF	Sophomore
Blake Penso	40	C	Senior

All-Big West Baseball Awards
Player	No.	Position	Class	Award Name
Ricky Ojeda	13	LHP	Sophomore	Pitcher of the Year
Ben Orloff	N/A	Coach	N/A	Coach of the Year
Colin Yeaman	34	INF	Junior	Field Player of the Year

All-Big West Baseball First Team
Player	No.	Position	Class
Trevor Hansen	28	RHP	Sophomore
Jacob McCombs	08	OF	Sophomore
Ricky Ojeda	13	LHP	Sophomore
Blake Penso	40	C	Senior
Colin Yeaman	34	INF	Junior

All-Big West Baseball Second Team
Player	No.	Position	Class
Chase Call	26	OF	Senior
Riley Kelly	17	RHP	RS Sophomore
Max Martin	11	RHP	Junior
Anthony Martinez	55	INF	Junior

All-Big West Baseball Honorable Mentions
Player	No.	Position	Class
Will Bermudez	16	INF	RS Senior
Ryder Brooks	42	LHP	RS Sophomore
Frankie Carney	23	INF	RS Sophomore

== Rankings ==
Ranking movements Legend: ██ Increase in ranking ██ Decrease in ranking — = Not ranked RV = Received votes
	Week																	
Poll	Pre	1	2	3	4	5	6	7	8	9	10	11	12	13	14	15	16	Final
Coaches'	RV	RV*	RV	25	RV	RV	21	13	15	14	12	9	15	12	18	19	19*	23
Baseball America	24	21	20	18	18	20	17	13	18	16	13	9	17	12	22	22*	22*	—
NCBWA†	RV	RV	RV	RV	RV	RV	21	11	13	13	13	13	11	13	11	20	RV	RV
D1Baseball	—	—	—	—	—	—	19	12	13	13	12	8	13	12	20	23	23*	25
Perfect Game	—	—	—	RV	—	—	20	12	14	14	11	7	15	12	19	19*	19*	25

† NCBWA ranks 30 teams in their preseason poll, but only ranks 25 teams weekly during the season.
* A new poll was not released for this week, so for comparison purposes, the previous week's ranking is inserted in this week's slot.
