= 2025 Cal State Fullerton Titans baseball team =

American college baseball season

2025 Cal State Fullerton Titans baseball
- Conference: Big West Conference
- Record: 29–25 (19–11 Big West)
- Head coach: Jason Dietrich (4th season)
- Assistant coaches: Neil Walton; Josh Belovsky; Ryan Day
- Home stadium: Goodwin Field

2025 Big West Conference baseball standings
	Conf.						Overall
Team	W		L		T	PCT	W		L		T	PCT
No. 25 UC Irvine ‍†‍‍^{y}	24	–	6	–	0	.800	43	–	17	–	0	.717
Cal Poly ‍‍‡‍^{y}	23	–	7	–	0	.767	43	–	19	–	0	.694
Cal State Fullerton ‍‍‍	19	–	11	–	0	.633	29	–	27	–	0	.518
UC Santa Barbara ‍‍‍	16	–	14	–	0	.533	36	–	18	–	0	.667
Hawai'i ‍‍‍	16	–	14	–	0	.533	35	–	21	–	0	.625
UC San Diego ‍‍‍	15	–	15	–	0	.500	26	–	25	–	0	.510
Long Beach State ‍‍‍	15	–	15	–	0	.500	22	–	31	–	0	.415
UC Davis ‍‍‍	13	–	17	–	0	.433	27	–	28	–	0	.491
CSUN ‍‍‍	10	–	20	–	0	.333	15	–	34	–	0	.306
Cal State Bakersfield ‍‍‍	9	–	21	–	0	.300	18	–	38	–	0	.321
UC Riverside ‍‍‍	5	–	25	–	0	.167	16	–	36	–	0	.308
† – Conference champion ‡ – Tournament champion y – Invited to the NCAA tournament As of June 23, 2025; Rankings from D1Baseball

The 2025-Cal State Fullerton Titans baseball team will represent California State University, Fullerton during the 2025 NCAA Division I baseball season. The Titans will play their home games at Goodwin Field and will be led by fourth-year head coach Jason Dietrich.

== Previous season ==
The Titans finished 16-38 overall, and 7-23 in the conference, and they failed to qualify for the 2024 NCAA Division I baseball tournament. It was the program's 3rd losing season in 4 seasons with the only time they were above .500 was in 2023.

== Personnel ==
=== Starters ===
Lineup
Pos.	No.	Player.	Year

Weekend pitching rotation
Day	No.	Player.	Year
Friday			
Saturday			
Sunday			

== Schedule ==
Legend
	Titans win
	Titans loss
	Postponement
**Bold**	Titans team member
*	Non-Conference Game

2025 Cal State Fullerton Titans baseball game log (23–21)
Regular season (23–21)
February (1–8)

Date Time (PT)	Opponent	Rank	Site/stadium	Score	Win	Loss	Save	TV	Attendance	Overall record	Big West record
February 14th 6:30 p.m.	vs. Stanford*		Goodwin Field; Fullerton, California					ESPN+		-	-
February 15th 2:00 p.m. DH	vs. Stanford*		Goodwin Field; Fullerton, California	**L** 1-13^{7}	Scott (1-0)	**Blood** (0-1)	—	ESPN+	1,424	0-1	—
February 15th 5:00 p.m DH	vs. Stanford*		Goodwin Field; Fullerton, California	**L** 3-6	Lim (1-0)	**Negrete** (0-1)	Uber (1)	ESPN+	1,804	0-2	—
February 16th 1:00 p.m.	vs. Stanford*		Goodwin Field; Fullerton, California	**L** 11-14	Speshyock (1-0)	**Goff** (0-1)	Keenan (1)	ESPN+	1,907	0-3	—
February 17th 1:00 p.m.	vs. Stanford*		Goodwin Field; Fullerton, California	**L** 7-9^{10}	Keenan (1-0)	**Wright** (0-1)	—	ESPN+	1,037	0-4	—
February 21st 6:05 p.m.	at Fresno State*		Pete Beiden Field; Fresno, California	**L** 4-7	Anker (2-0)	**Turner** (0-1)	Bergman (1)		1,694	0-5	—
February 22nd 3:05 p.m.	at Fresno State*		Pete Beiden Field; Fresno, California	**W** 14-3	**Negrete** (1-1)	Cremarosa (1-1)	**Wright** (1)		2,004	1-5	—
February 23rd 1:05 p.m.	at Fresno State*		Pete Beiden Field; Fresno, California	**L** 7-13	Guerrero (1-0)	**Hawkinson** (0-1)	—		2,591	1-6	—
February 25th 6:00 p.m.	vs. USC*		Goodwin Field; Fullerton, California	**L** 3–5	Rizzo (4–0)	**Smith** (0–1)	Hedges (3)	ESPN+	1,556	1-7	-
February 28th 1:00 p.m.	at Wichita State*		Eck Stadium; Wichita, Kansas	**L** 4–5	Arnold (1–0)	**Krakoski** (0–1)	None	ESPN+	1,527	1-8	-

March (12–6)

Date Time (PT)	Opponent	Rank	Site/stadium	Score	Win	Loss	Save	TV	Attendance	Overall record	Big West record
March 1st 12:00 p.m.	at Wichita State*		Eck Stadium; Wichita, Kansas	**W** 5–0	**Blood** (1–1)	Mulamekic (0–1)	**Wright** (2)	ESPN+	1,662	2-8	-
March 2nd 10:00 a.m.	at Wichita State*		Eck Stadium; Wichita, Kansas	**W** 7–5	**Goff** (1–1)	Anderson (0–2)	**Meyer** (1)	ESPN+	1,479	3-8	-
March 4th 6:00 p.m.	vs San Diego State*		Goodwin Field; Fullerton, California	**W** 7–1	**Harper** (1–0)	Rumary (0–1)	None	ESPN+	907	4-8	-
March 7th 6:00 p.m.	at Cal Poly		Robin Baggett Stadium; San Luis Obispo, California	**L** 9–10^{11}	Sagouspe (2–1)	**Wright** (0–2)	None	TBD	1,632	4-9	0-1
March 8th 3:00 p.m.	at Cal Poly		Robin Baggett Stadium; San Luis Obispo, California	**L** 8–11	Downs (2–0)	**Goff** (1–2)	Sagouspe (2)	TBD	1,838	4-10	0-2
March 9th 1:00 p.m.	at Cal Poly		Robin Baggett Stadium; San Luis Obispo, California	**L** 4–10	Marmie (2–1)	**Hernandez** (0–1)	None	TBD	1,976	4-11	0-3
March 11th 6:00 p.m.	vs USC*		Goodwin Field; Fullerton, California	**W** 11–6	**Meyer** (1–0)	Southisene (0–1)	None	ESPN+	688	5-11	-
March 14th 6:30 p.m.	vs UC San Diego		Goodwin Field; Fullerton, California	**L** 7–9^{11}	Davidson (2–0)	**Blood** (1–2)	Villar (1)	ESPN+	690	5-12	0-4
March 15th 5:00 p.m.	vs UC San Diego		Goodwin Field; Fullerton, California	**L** 5–9	Weber (1–0)	**Hawkinson** (0–2)	Villar (2)	ESPN+	977	5-13	0-5
March 16th 1:00 p.m.	vs UC San Diego		Goodwin Field; Fullerton, California	**W** 12–5	**Meyer** (2–0)	Murdock (0–1)	None	ESPN+	963	6-13	1-5
March 18th 6:00 p.m.	vs UNLV*		Goodwin Field; Fullerton, California	**W** 4–0	**Martin** (1–0)	Albright (0–1)	**Blood** (1)	ESPN+	899	7-13	-
March 21st 6:00 p.m.	at UC Riverside		Riverside Sports Complex; Riverside, California	**W** 12–1	**Negrete** (2–1)	Marton (1–3)	None	ESPN+	303	8-13	2-5
March 22nd 6:00 p.m.	at UC Riverside		Riverside Sports Complex; Riverside, California	**W** 18–3	**Blood** (2–2)	O'Brien (1–3)	None	ESPN+	293	9-13	3-5
March 23rd 1:00 p.m.	at UC Riverside		Riverside Sports Complex; Riverside, California	**W** 10–5	**Turner** (1–1)	Flores (2–2)	None	ESPN+	254	10-13	4-5
March 25th 6:00 p.m.	vs San Diego*		Goodwin Field; Fullerton, California	**W** 6–2	**Hawkinson** (1–2)	Horn Jr. (0–1)	None	ESPN+	923	11-13	-
March 28th 6:30 p.m.	vs Cal State Bakersfield		Goodwin Field; Fullerton, California	**W** 8–1	**Negrete** (3–1)	King (0–4)	None	ESPN+	834	12-13	5-5
March 29th 5:00 p.m.	vs Cal State Bakersfield		Goodwin Field; Fullerton, California	**W** 6–1	**Smith** (1–1)	McAlinden (1–3)	**Wright** (3)	ESPN+	1,170	13-13	6-5
March 30th 1:00 p.m.	vs Cal State Bakersfield		Goodwin Field; Fullerton, California	**L** 5–6	Riley (3–2)	**Faulks** (0–1)	None	ESPN+	967	13-14	6-6

April (4–1)

Date Time (PT)	Opponent	Rank	Site/stadium	Score	Win	Loss	Save	TV	Attendance	Overall record	Big West record
April 1st 6:30 p.m.	at No. 24 Arizona State*		Phoenix Municipal Stadium; Tempe, Arizona	**L** 4–14^{7}	Schaefer (1–0)	**Martin** (1–1)	None	ESPN+	2,968	13–15	-
April 2nd 6:00 p.m.	at Grand Canyon*		GCU Ballpark; Phoenix, Arizona	**W** 4–2	**Faulks** (1–1)	Clark (2–1)	**Wright** (4)	TBD	434	14–15	-
April 4th 6:00 p.m.	at Cal State Northridge		Matador Field; Northridge, California	**W** 16–5	**Negrete** (4–1)	Mejia (0–1)	None	TBD	332	15–15	7–6
April 5th 5:00 p.m.	at Cal State Northridge		Matador Field; Northridge, California	**W** 9–3	**Meyer** (3–0)	Gutierrez (2–3)	**Faulks** (1)	ESPN+	424	16–15	8–6
April 6th 1:00 p.m.	at Cal State Northridge		Matador Field; Northridge, California	**W** 10–8	**Dockan** (1–0)	Mendes (2–1)	**Wright** (5)	ESPN+	344	17–15	9–6
April 11th 6:30 p.m.	vs No. 8 Oregon State*		Goodwin Field; Fullerton, California					ESPN+		-	-
April 12th 5:00 p.m.	vs No. 8 Oregon State*		Goodwin Field; Fullerton, California					ESPN+		-	-
April 13th 1:00 p.m.	vs No. 8 Oregon State*		Goodwin Field; Fullerton, California					ESPN+		-	-
April 15th 6:00 p.m	vs Pepperdine*		Goodwin Field; Fullerton, California					ESPN+		-	-
April 17th 6:00 p.m.	vs Long Beach State		Goodwin Field; Fullerton, California					ESPN+		-	-
April 18th 6:00 p.m.	vs Long Beach State		Goodwin Field; Fullerton, California					ESPN+		-	-
April 19th 1:00 p.m.	vs Long Beach State		Goodwin Field; Fullerton, California					ESPN+		-	-
April 22nd 6:00 p.m.	at San Diego State*		Tony Gwynn Stadium; San Diego, California					TBD		-	-
April 25th 6:00 p.m.	at UC Davis		Dobbins Stadium; Davis, California					TBD		-	-
April 26th 6:00 p.m.	at UC Davis		Dobbins Stadium; Davis, California					TBD		-	-
April 27th 1:00 p.m.	at UC Davis		Dobbins Stadium; Davis, California					TBD		-	-
April 29th TBD p.m.	vs No. 8 UC Irvine*		Angel Stadium; Anaheim, California					TBD		-	-

May (0-0)

Date Time (PT)	Opponent	Rank	Site/stadium	Score	Win	Loss	Save	TV	Attendance	Overall record	Big West record
May 2nd 6:30 p.m.	vs UC Santa Barbara		Goodwin Field; Fullerton, California					ESPN+		-	-
May 3rd 5:00 p.m.	vs UC Santa Barbara		Goodwin Field; Fullerton, California					ESPN+		-	-
May 4th 1:00 p.m.	vs UC Santa Barbara		Goodwin Field; Fullerton, California					ESPN+		-	-
May 6th 6:00 p.m.	at San Diego*		Fowler Park; San Diego, California					TBD		-	-
May 9th 6:30 p.m.	vs Hawaii*		Goodwin Field; Fullerton, California					ESPN+		-	-
May 10th 5:00 p.m.	vs Hawaii		Goodwin Field; Fullerton, California					ESPN+		-	-
May 11th 1:00 p.m.	vs Hawaii		Goodwin Field; Fullerton. California					ESPN+		-	-
May 15th 6:00 p.m.	at No. 12 UC Irvine		Anteater Ballpark; Irvine, California					TBD		-	-
May 16th 6:00 p.m.	at No. 12 UC Irvine		Anteater Ballpark; Irvine, California					TBD		-	-
May 17th 1:00 p.m.	at No. 12 UC Irvine		Anteater Ballpark; Irvine, California					TBD		-	-

Source: Rankings are based on the team's current ranking in the D1Baseball poll. Parentheses indicate tournament seedings.

== Rankings ==
Ranking movements Legend: — = Not ranked
	Week																
Poll	Pre	1	2	3	4	5	6	7	8	9	10	11	12	13	14	15	Final
Coaches'	—	—*	—														
Baseball America	—	—	—														
Collegiate Baseball^	—	—	—														
NCBWA†	—	—	—														
D1Baseball	—	—	—														

^ Collegiate Baseball ranked 40 teams in their preseason poll, but only ranked 30 teams weekly during the season.
† NCBWA ranks 30 teams in their preseason poll, but only ranks 25 teams weekly during the season.
* A new poll was not released for this week, so for comparison purposes, the previous week's ranking is inserted in this week's slot.
