= 2025 Hawaii Rainbow Warriors baseball team =

American college baseball season

2025 Hawaii Rainbow Warriors baseball
- Conference: Big West Conference
- Record: 35–21 (16–14 Big West)
- Head coach: Rich Hill (4th season)
- Associate head coach: Keith Zuniga (2nd season)
- Assistant coaches: Lindsay Meggs (2nd season); Rayson Romero (2nd season); Casey Isa (2nd season); Chris Jimenez (2nd season)
- Hitting coach: Dave Nakama (4th season)
- Pitching coach: Keith Zuniga (2nd season)
- Home stadium: Les Murakami Stadium

2025 Big West Conference baseball standings
	Conf.						Overall
Team	W		L		T	PCT	W		L		T	PCT
No. 25 UC Irvine ‍†‍‍^{y}	24	–	6	–	0	.800	43	–	17	–	0	.717
Cal Poly ‍‍‡‍^{y}	23	–	7	–	0	.767	43	–	19	–	0	.694
Cal State Fullerton ‍‍‍	19	–	11	–	0	.633	29	–	27	–	0	.518
UC Santa Barbara ‍‍‍	16	–	14	–	0	.533	36	–	18	–	0	.667
Hawai'i ‍‍‍	16	–	14	–	0	.533	35	–	21	–	0	.625
UC San Diego ‍‍‍	15	–	15	–	0	.500	26	–	25	–	0	.510
Long Beach State ‍‍‍	15	–	15	–	0	.500	22	–	31	–	0	.415
UC Davis ‍‍‍	13	–	17	–	0	.433	27	–	28	–	0	.491
CSUN ‍‍‍	10	–	20	–	0	.333	15	–	34	–	0	.306
Cal State Bakersfield ‍‍‍	9	–	21	–	0	.300	18	–	38	–	0	.321
UC Riverside ‍‍‍	5	–	25	–	0	.167	16	–	36	–	0	.308
† – Conference champion ‡ – Tournament champion y – Invited to the NCAA tournament As of June 23, 2025; Rankings from D1Baseball

The 2025 Hawaii Rainbow Warriors baseball team represent the University of Hawaiʻi at Mānoa during the 2025 NCAA Division I baseball season. Hawaii is competing in the Big West Conference. The Rainbow Warriors played their home games at Les Murakami Stadium. Coach Rich Hill is leading the Rainbow Warriors in his fourth season with the program.

== Previous season ==
The 2020 Hawaii Rainbow Warriors baseball team notched an 37–16 (20–10) regular-season record during the 2024 season. The Rainbow Warriors finished third in the Big West Conference. Hawaii did not receive an at-large berth into the NCAA tournament.

== Personnel ==
=== Starters ===
Lineup
Pos.	No.	Player.	Year
C	33	Konnor Palmeira	Senior
1B	4	Ben Zeigler-Namoa	Senior
2B	2	Shunsuke Sakaino	Senior
3B	23	Xaige Lancaster	Sophomore
SS	1	Elijah Ickes	Sophomore
LF	25	Kamana Nahaku	Senior
CF	37	Matthew Miura	Junior
RF	21	Jared Quandt	Senior
DH	5	Draven Nushida	Junior

Weekend pitching rotation
Day	No.	Player.	Year
Friday	36	Sebastian Gonzalez	Sophomore
Saturday	17	Itsuki Takemoto	Sophomore
Sunday	41	Liam O'Brien	Senior

=== Roster ===
2025 Hawaii Rainbow Warriors baseball team
Players
Coaches

#	Pos.	Name	B/T	Height	Weight	Year	Home town
1	INF	Elijah Ickes	R/R	6 ft 0 in (1.83 m)	175 lb (79 kg)	So	(Hawaii) Wahiawa
2	INF	Shunsuke Sakaino	L/R	5 ft 9 in (1.75 m)	180 lb (82 kg)	Sr	(California) San Diego
3	INF	Jordan Donahue	L/R	5 ft 10 in (1.78 m)	170 lb (77 kg)	Sr	(Hawaii) Mililani
4	UTL	Ben Zeigler-Namoa	L/L	6 ft 1 in (1.85 m)	195 lb (88 kg)	Sr	(Hawaii) Lahaina
5	OF	Draven Nushida	L/R	5 ft 10 in (1.78 m)	170 lb (77 kg)	Jr	(Hawaii) Kailua
6	INF	Kedren Kinzie	R/R	6 ft 3 in (1.91 m)	205 lb (93 kg)	Jr	(Hawaii) Hilo
8	INF	Jarret Nielsen	R/R	5 ft 11 in (1.8 m)	210 lb (95 kg)	Fr	(California) Cerritos
12	RHP	Freddy Rodriguez	R/R	6 ft 3 in (1.91 m)	210 lb (95 kg)	Jr	(California) West Sacramento
13	LHP	Joshua Surigao	L/L	6 ft 4 in (1.93 m)	200 lb (91 kg)	Fr	(South Carolina) Little River
15	OF	Jack Salmon	L/R	6 ft 3 in (1.91 m)	215 lb (98 kg)	Jr	(California) Newport Beach
17	UTL	Itsuki Takemoto	L/R	6 ft 3 in (1.91 m)	200 lb (91 kg)	So	(Japan) Wakayama
18	RHP	Cooper Walls	R/R	6 ft 5 in (1.96 m)	215 lb (98 kg)	Fr	(California) Carlsbad
19	RHP	Max Jones	R/R	5 ft 9 in (1.75 m)	180 lb (82 kg)	Gr	(California) San Diego
20	OF	Will Bowen	L/L	6 ft 0 in (1.83 m)	180 lb (82 kg)	Jr	(California) Redwood City
21	OF	Jared Quandt	S/R	6 ft 1 in (1.85 m)	190 lb (86 kg)	Sr	(California) Los Gatos
22	INF	Kevin Ferguson (redshirt)	R/R	6 ft 4 in (1.93 m)	225 lb (102 kg)	Fr	(Washington (state)) Battle Ground
23	UTL	Xaige Lancaster	R/R	6 ft 2 in (1.88 m)	175 lb (79 kg)	So	(Hawaii) Hilo
24	OF	Britton Beeson	R/R	6 ft 2 in (1.88 m)	205 lb (93 kg)	Jr	(California) Villa Park
25	OF	Kamana Nahaku	R/R	5 ft 10 in (1.78 m)	185 lb (84 kg)	Sr	(Washington (state)) Auburn
26	RHP	Isaiah Magdaleno	R/R	6 ft 3 in (1.91 m)	215 lb (98 kg)	So	(California) Los Angeles
27	RHP	Josiah Shipley	R/R	6 ft 4 in (1.93 m)	230 lb (104 kg)	Sr	(Oregon) Beaverton
28	RHP	Danny Veloz	R/R	6 ft 1 in (1.85 m)	195 lb (88 kg)	Sr	(California) Pacoima
29	C	David Vergel de Dios	R/R	5 ft 10 in (1.78 m)	195 lb (88 kg)	Fr	(Hawaii) Kahului
31	LHP	Bobby Perebzak	L/L	5 ft 11 in (1.8 m)	195 lb (88 kg)	Jr	(Ohio) Wadsworth
32	C	Hunter Faildo	R/R	5 ft 10 in (1.78 m)	195 lb (88 kg)	Jr	(Hawaii) Miliani
33	C	Konnor Palmeira	R/R	6 ft 0 in (1.83 m)	220 lb (100 kg)	Sr	(Hawaii) Kahului
34	RHP	Zacary Tenn	R/R	6 ft 0 in (1.83 m)	185 lb (84 kg)	So	(Hawaii) Kailua
35	RHP	Ethan Thomas	R/R	6 ft 5 in (1.96 m)	230 lb (104 kg)	RS Fr	(California) Alameda
36	LHP	Sebastian Gonzalez	L/L	5 ft 10 in (1.78 m)	185 lb (84 kg)	So	(California) Oakley
37	OF	Matthew Miura	R/R	5 ft 11 in (1.8 m)	185 lb (84 kg)	Jr	(Hawaii) Honolulu
38	RHP	Charlie Adamson	R/R	6 ft 4 in (1.93 m)	200 lb (91 kg)	Sr	(California) Malibu
40	LHP	Jimmy Urban	L/L	6 ft 8 in (2.03 m)	240 lb (109 kg)	Jr	(Arizona) Phoenix
41	RHP	Liam O'Brien	R/R	6 ft 5 in (1.96 m)	215 lb (98 kg)	Sr	(Arizona) Tucson
43	RHP	Kyle Dobyns	R/R	6 ft 5 in (1.96 m)	200 lb (91 kg)	Sr	(California) San Diego
44	LHP	Cory Ronan	L/L	6 ft 2 in (1.88 m)	195 lb (88 kg)	Jr	(Illinois) Jacksonville
47	OF	Aidan Kuni	L/R	6 ft 0 in (1.83 m)	190 lb (86 kg)	Jr	(Texas) Flower Mound
48	RHP	Anthony Andrews	R/R	5 ft 11 in (1.8 m)	190 lb (86 kg)	Fr	(California) Los Gatos
49	LHP	Dylan Waite	L/L	6 ft 2 in (1.88 m)	190 lb (86 kg)	Sr	(Hawaii) Wailuku
51	RHP	Kaysen Raineri	R/R	6 ft 1 in (1.85 m)	215 lb (98 kg)	Fr	(California) Temecula
54	RHP	Koen Barton	R/R	6 ft 4 in (1.93 m)	215 lb (98 kg)	Fr	(Hawaii) Wahiawa

Head coach

Rich Hill

Assistant coach(es)

Keith Zuniga
Dave Nakama
Lindsay Meggs

Legend

- (C) Team captain
- (S) Suspended
- (I) Ineligible
- Injured
- Current redshirt

Roster
Last update: March 9, 2025

== Offseason ==
=== Departures ===
Offseason departures
Name	Number	Pos.	Height	Weight	Year	Hometown	Notes
Jake Tsukada	2	INF	5 ft 9 in (1.75 m)	175 pounds (79 kg)	Senior	Aiea, Hi	Graduated
Aaron Ujimori	5	INF	5 ft 9 in (1.75 m)	170 pounds (77 kg)	Senior	Honolulu, HI	Graduated
Kyson Donahue	6	INF	6 ft 3 in (1.91 m)	210 pounds (95 kg)	Senior	Honolulu, HI	Graduated
Connor Harrison	7	LHP	6 ft 0 in (1.83 m)	185 pounds (84 kg)	Senior	Granite Bay, CA	Graduated
Dallas Duarte	8	C	5 ft 9 in (1.75 m)	170 pounds (77 kg)	Graduate	Hilo, HI	Graduated
Stone Miyao	9	INF	5 ft 10 in (1.78 m)	170 pounds (77 kg)	Senior	Hilo, HI	Graduated
Tai Atkins	12	LHP	5 ft 10 in (1.78 m)	185 pounds (84 kg)	Senior	Kohala, HI	Graduated
Randy Abshier	13	LHP	6 ft 4 in (1.93 m)	185 pounds (84 kg)	Graduate	San Diego, CA	Graduated
Rylen Bayne	15	RHP	6 ft 1 in (1.85 m)	200 pounds (91 kg)	Junior	Port Orchard, WA	Did not return
Nainoa Cardinez	18	UTL	6 ft 2 in (1.88 m)	200 pounds (91 kg)	Senior	Kapaa, HI	Graduated
Austin Machado	19	C	6 ft 1 in (1.85 m)	205 pounds (93 kg)	Junior	Cardiff by the Sea, CA	Signed with Atlanta Braves as undrafted free agent
Naighel Calderon	20	OF	5 ft 9 in (1.75 m)	170 pounds (77 kg)	Senior	Lanai City, HI	Graduated
Sean Rimmer	24	OF	6 ft 3 in (1.91 m)	205 pounds (93 kg)	Senior	Mesa, AZ	Graduated
Trevor Ichimura	29	RHP	6 ft 0 in (1.83 m)	205 pounds (93 kg)	Senior	Mililani, HI	Graduated
Blake Hiraki	31	C	5 ft 11 in (1.80 m)	190 pounds (86 kg)	Senior	Mililani, HI	Graduated
Tyler Dyball	35	RHP	6 ft 2 in (1.88 m)	180 pounds (82 kg)	Senior	Honolulu, HI	Graduated
Myles Standish	48	LHP	6 ft 0 in (1.83 m)	185 pounds (84 kg)	Freshman	Eureka, CA	Did not return

==== Outgoing transfers ====
Outgoing transfers
Name	Number	Pos.	Height	Weight	Hometown	Year	New school	Source
Bronson Rivera	27	INF	6 ft 2 in (1.88 m)	200 pounds (91 kg)	Holualoa, HI	Junior	Hawaii Pacific	
Hunter Gotschall	33	RHP	6 ft 0 in (1.83 m)	195 pounds (88 kg)	Peyton, CO	Freshman	SLCC (Note: Junior college)	
DJ Akiyama	34	INF	6 ft 1 in (1.85 m)	180 pounds (82 kg)	Aiea, HI	Junior	Campbell	
Harrison Bodendorf	41	LHP	6 ft 5 in (1.96 m)	170 pounds (77 kg)	Temecula, CA	Sophomore	Oklahoma State	
Alex Giroux	50	RHP	6 ft 0 in (1.83 m)	185 pounds (84 kg)	Lake Oswego, OR	Junior	Miami (FL)	
Brayden Marx	54	RHP	6 ft 0 in (1.83 m)	185 pounds (84 kg)	Pleasant Grove, UT	Freshman	BYU	

==== 2024 MLB draft ====
No Hawaii players were selected in the 2024 MLB draft.

=== Acquisitions ===
==== Incoming transfers ====
Incoming transfers
Name	Number	Pos.	Height	Weight	Hometown	Year	Previous school	Source
Shunsuke Sakaino	2	INF	5 ft 9 in (1.75 m)	180 pounds (82 kg)	San Diego, CA	Senior	CSUN	
Draven Nushida	5	INF/OF	5 ft 10 in (1.78 m)	170 pounds (77 kg)	Kailua, HI	Junior	Cal State Fullerton	
Kedren Kinzie	6	INF	6 ft 3 in (1.91 m)	205 pounds (93 kg)	Hilo, HI	Junior	Pierce (WA)	
Freddy Rodriguez	12	RHP	6 ft 3 in (1.91 m)	210 pounds (95 kg)	West Sacramento, CA	Junior	Cal Poly	
Jake Salmon	15	OF	6 ft 3 in (1.91 m)	215 pounds (98 kg)	Newport Beach, CA	Junior	Golden West	
Max Jones	19	RHP	5 ft 9 in (1.75 m)	180 pounds (82 kg)	San Diego, CA	Graduate	San Francisco	
Will Bowen	20	OF	6 ft 0 in (1.83 m)	180 pounds (82 kg)	Redwood City, CA	Junior	San Mateo	
Britton Beeson	24	OF	6 ft 2 in (1.88 m)	205 pounds (93 kg)	Villa Park, CA	Junior	Fullerton College	
Josiah Shipley	27	RHP	6 ft 4 in (1.93 m)	230 pounds (100 kg)	Beaverton, OR	Junior	Clackamas	
Bobby Perebzak	31	LHP	5 ft 11 in (1.80 m)	195 pounds (88 kg)	Wadsworth, OH	Junior	San Diego City College	
Liam O'Brien	41	RHP	6 ft 5 in (1.96 m)	215 pounds (98 kg)	Tucson, AZ	Senior	Gonzaga	
Aidan Kuni	47	RHP	6 ft 0 in (1.83 m)	190 pounds (86 kg)	Flower Mound, TX	Junior	McLennan	

==== Incoming recruits ====
2025 Hawai'i Recruits
Name	Number	B/T	Pos.	Height	Weight	Hometown	High School	Source
Jarret Nielsen	8	R/R	INF	5 ft 11 in (1.80 m)	210 pounds (95 kg)	Cerritos, CA	Long Beach Jordan	
Joshua Surigao	13	L/L	LHP	6 ft 4 in (1.93 m)	200 pounds (91 kg)	Little River, CA	North Myrtle Beach	
Cooper Walls	18	R/R	RHP	6 ft 5 in (1.96 m)	215 pounds (98 kg)	Carlsbad, CA	La Costa Canyon	
David Vergel de Dios	29	R/R	UTL	5 ft 10 in (1.78 m)	195 pounds (88 kg)	Kahului, HI	Maui	
Anthony Andrews	48	R/R	RHP	5 ft 11 in (1.80 m)	190 pounds (86 kg)	Las Gatos, CA	Los Gatos	
Kaysen Raineri	51	R/R	RHP	6 ft 1 in (1.85 m)	215 pounds (98 kg)	Temecula, CA	Great Oak	
Koen Barton	54	R/R	RHP	6 ft 4 in (1.93 m)	215 pounds (98 kg)	Wahiawa, HI	Leilehua	

== Preseason ==
=== Coaches poll ===
The coaches poll was released on February 7, 2025. Hawaii was selected to finish fourth the conference.

Coaches' Poll
Predicted finish	Team	Points
1	UCSB	99 (9)
2	UC Irvine	89 (2)
3	Cal Poly	79
4	Hawaii	76
5	UC San Diego	63
6	CSUN	50
7	UC Davis	47
T−8	Cal State Fullerton	36
T−8	Long Beach State	36
10	Cal State Bakersfield	18
11	UC Riverside	12

== Game log ==
2025 Hawaii Rainbow Warriors baseball game log (35–21)
Regular season: 33–19 (Home: 25–10; Away: 8–9)

February: 8–1 (Home: 8–1; Away: 0–0)
Date	TV	Opponent	Rank	Stadium	Score	Win	Loss	Save	Attendance	Overall	BWC
February 14	SSN	Marshall*		Les Murakami Stadium; Honolulu, HI	**W** 9–8	**Waite** (1–0)	Baird (0–1)	None	3,806	1–0	—
February 15^{DH}		Marshall*		Les Murakami Stadium	**W** 6–2^{7}	**Takemoto** (1–0)	DiGiacomo (0–1)	None	3,956	2–0	—
February 15^{DH}		Marshall*		Les Murakami Stadium	**W** 7–6	**Tenn** (1–0)	Weyrich (0–1)	None	3,956	3–0	—
February 16		Marshall*		Les Murakami Stadium	**W** 10–2	**Thomas** (1–0)	Collins (0–1)	None	3,520	4–0	—
February 20	SSN	Wichita State*		Les Murakami Stadium	**W** 4–3^{10}	**Magdaleno** (1–0)	Potter (0–1)	None	3,080	5–0	—
February 21	SSN	Wichita State*		Les Murakami Stadium	**L** 4–11	Hamilton (1–1)	**Takemoto** (1–1)	None	3,925	5–1	—
February 22		Wichita State*		Les Murakami Stadium	**W** 4–2	**Ronan** (1–0)	Holmes (0–1)	**Magdaleno** (1)	4,535	6–1	—
February 23		Wichita State*		Les Murakami Stadium	**W** 7–1	**O'Brien** (1–0)	Miner (1–1)	**Rodriguez** (1)	3,559	7–1	—
February 28		Northeastern*		Les Murakami Stadium	**W** 11–5	**Rodriguez** (1–0)	Gottesman (0–1)	None	3,509	8–1	—

March: 12–5 (Home: 9–2; Away: 3–3)
Date	TV	Opponent	Rank	Stadium	Score	Win	Loss	Save	Attendance	Overall	BWC
March 1		Northeastern*		Les Murakami Stadium	**L** 1–7	Jones (3–0)	**Takemoto** (1–2)	None	4,472	8–2	—
March 2		Northeastern*		Les Murakami Stadium	**W** 11–3	**O'Brien** (2–0)	Cabral (1–2)	None	3,485	9–2	—
March 3		Northeastern*		Les Murakami Stadium	**W** 3–2^{12}	**Veloz** (1–0)	Beauchesne (0–2)	None	3,031	10–2	—
March 7	ESPN+	at UC Riverside		Riverside Sports Complex; Riverside, CA	**W** 17–5	**Walls** (1–0)	Torres (0–1)	None	202	11–2	1–0
March 8	ESPN+	at UC Riverside		Riverside Sports Complex	**L** 3–4^{13}	Millman (2–0)	**Tenn** (1–1)	None	275	11–3	1–1
March 9	ESPN+	at UC Riverside		Riverside Sports Complex	**L** 4–7	Flores (2–0)	**Ronan** (1–1)	None	264	11–4	1–2
March 11		Chaminade*		Les Murakami Stadium	**W** 9–4	**Waite** (2–0)	Wells (0–1)	None	3,144	12–4	—
March 14		No. 15 UCSB		Les Murakami Stadium	**L** 1–2	Bremner (2–1)	**Takemoto** (1–3)	Jackson (2)	3,948	12–5	1–3
March 15		No. 15 UCSB		Les Murakami Stadium	**W** 15–7	**Rodriguez** (2–0)	Flora (1–1)	**Magdaleno** (2)	4,421	13–5	2–3
March 16		No. 15 UCSB		Les Murakami Stadium	**W** 1–0	**Walls** (2–0)	Proskey (1–2)	**Magdaleno** (3)	3,914	14–5	3–3
March 22	SSN	UC Davis		Les Murakami Stadium	**W** 7–2	**Takemoto** (2–3)	Valdez (2–2)	None	4,589	15–5	4–3
March 23		UC Davis		Les Murakami Stadium	**W** 16–0	**Gonzalez** (1–0)	Wood (2–1)	None	3,981	16–5	5–3
March 24	SSN	UC Davis		Les Murakami Stadium	**W** 2–1^{13}	**Magdaleno** (2–0)	Delaney (0–2)	None	3,255	17–5	6–3
March 25		Hawaii–Hilo*		Les Murakami Stadium	**W** 9–8^{10}	**Barton** (1–0)	Pressley (2–3)	None	3,449	18–5	—
March 28		at CSUN		Matador Field; Northridge, CA	**L** 10–15	Halamicek (1–3)	**Takemoto** (2–4)	Miller (1)	346	18–6	6–4
March 29		at CSUN		Matador Field	**W** 9–3	**Gonzalez** (2–0)	King (0–1)	**Magdaleno** (4)	276	19–6	7–4
March 30		at CSUN		Matador Field	**W** 14–10	**Magdaleno** (3–0)	Hernandez (0–2)	None	274	20–6	8–4

April: 8–8 (Home: 5–4; Away: 3–4)
Date	TV	Opponent	Rank	Stadium	Score	Win	Loss	Save	Attendance	Overall	BWC
April 1		Hawaii Pacific*		Les Murakami Stadium	**W** 10–8	**Rodriguez** (3–0)	Vanek (3–2)	**Thomas** (1)	3,234	21–6	—
April 4	SSN	Long Beach State		Les Murakami Stadium	**W** 10–5	**Gonzalez** (3–0)	Montgomery (5–3)	**Magdaleno** (5)	4,465	22–6	9–4
April 5	SSN	Long Beach State		Les Murakami Stadium	**L** 2–3	Roblez (2–0)	**O'Brien** (2–1)	Kahalekai (1)	4,585	22–7	9–5
April 6		Long Beach State		Les Murakami Stadium	**L** 4–5	Geiss (4–5)	**Walls** (2–1)	Kahalekai (2)	4,094	22–8	9–6
April 8		at Santa Clara*		Stephen Schott Stadium; Santa Clara, CA	**W** 5–3	**Jones** (1–0)	Habermann (0–1)	**Thomas** (2)	500	23–8	—
April 11		at Cal Poly		Robin Baggett Stadium; San Luis Obispo, CA	**W** 4–2^{10}	**Magdaleno** (4–0)	Sagouspe (3–2)	None	2,818	24–8	10–6
April 12		at Cal Poly		Robin Baggett Stadium	**L** 5–12	Downs (4–0)	**O'Brien** (2–2)	None	2,892	24–9	10–7
April 13		at Cal Poly		Robin Baggett Stadium	**L** 2–5	Torres (1–2)	**Walls** (2–2)	None	3,017	24–10	10–8
April 15	BTN+	at USC*		George C. Page Stadium; Los Angeles, CA	**W** 5–4	**Rodriguez** (4–0)	Matson (2–1)	**Thomas** (3)	498	25–10	—
April 17	ESPN+	at No. 13 UC Irvine		Anteater Ballpark; Irvine, CA	**L** 1–3	Ojeda (8–0)	**Ronan** (1–2)	Martin (9)	733	25–11	10–9
April 18	ESPN+	at No. 13 UC Irvine		Anteater Ballpark	**L** 0–4	Hansen (6–0)	**Adamson** (0–1)	None	1,170	25–12	10–10
April 19	ESPN+	at No. 13 UC Irvine		Anteater Ballpark	**L** 0–5	Brooks (5–2)	**Walls** (2–3)	None	1,089	25–13	10–11
April 22		Chaminade*		Les Murakami Stadium	**W** 14–7	**Jones** (2–0)	Cody (4–4)	None	3,040	26–13	—
April 25		Cal State Bakersfield		Les Murakami Stadium	**L** 6–7^{10}	Scheurman (1–0)	**Magdaleno** (4–1)	Gutierrez (1)	3,723	26–14	10–12
April 26		Cal State Bakersfield		Les Murakami Stadium	**W** 5–4	**Ronan** (2–0)	Gutierrez (3–5)	**Rodriguez** (2)	4,096	27–14	11–12
April 27		Cal State Bakersfield		Les Murakami Stadium	**W** 11–4	**O'Brien** (3–2)	Brown (1–1)	None	3,710	28–14	12–12

May: 7–7 (Home: 3–4; Away: 3–1; Neutral: 1–2)
Date	TV	Opponent	Rank	Stadium	Score	Win	Loss	Save	Attendance	Overall	BWC
May 2	SSN	No. 7 Oregon State		Les Murakami Stadium	**L** 4–11	Segura (7–1)	**Takemoto** (2–5)	None	4,635	28–15	—
May 3		No. 7 Oregon State		Les Murakami Stadium	**L** 2–3	Keljo (3–2)	**Rodriguez** (4–1)	None	4,488	28–16	—
May 4		No. 7 Oregon State		Les Murakami Stadium	**W** 5–0	**Walls** (3–3)	Kleinschmit (6–3)	None	4,406	29–16	—
May 5	SSN	No. 10 Oregon State*		Les Murakami Stadium	**L** 3–7	Queen (3–1)	**Thomas** (1–1)	Hutcheson (3)	4,451	29–17	—
May 9	ESPN+	at Cal State Fullerton*		Goodwin Field; Fullerton, CA	**W** 8–7	**Rodriguez** (5–1)	Negrete (5–2)	**Magdaleno** (6)	902	30–17	13–12
May 10	ESPN+	at Cal State Fullerton*		Goodwin Field	**L** 1–9	Harper (2–0)	**Gonzalez** (3–1)	None	853	30–18	13–13
May 11	ESPN+	at Cal State Fullerton*		Goodwin Field	**W** 10–2	**O'Brien** (4–2)	Hernandez (0–2)	None	686	31–18	14–13
May 15	ESPN+	UC San Diego		Les Murakami Stadium	**W** 6–3	**Rodriguez** (6–1)	Dalquist (6–5)	**Magdaleno** (7)	3,973	32–18	15–13
May 16	ESPN+	UC San Diego		Les Murakami Stadium	**L** 6–12	Murdock (1–3)	**O'Brien** (4–3)	None	4,529	32–19	15–14
May 17	ESPN+	UC San Diego		Les Murakami Stadium	**W** 13–2	**Rodriguez** (7–1)	Villar (1–5)	None	4,545	33–19	16–14

Postseason (2–2)

Big West tournament (2–2)
Date	TV	Opponent	Rank	Stadium	Score	Win	Loss	Save	Attendance	Overall	BWCT Record	Source
May 21	ESPN+	UC Santa Barbara (5)	(4)	Goodwin Field	**W** 6–2	**Ronan (3-2)**	Jackson (6–3)	**Magdaleno** (8)	478	34–19	1–0	
May 22	ESPN+	No. 20 UC Irvine (1)	(4)	Goodwin Field	**L** 5–7	Ojeda (13–0)	**Takemoto (2-6)**	Martin (14)	554	34–20	1–1	
May 23	ESPN+	at Cal State Fullerton (3)	(4)	Goodwin Field	**W** 16–4	**Ronan (4-2)**	Harper (3–1)	**Magdaleno** (9)	478	35–20	2–1	
May 24	ESPN+	Cal Poly (2)	(4)	Goodwin Field	**L** 1–2	Morano (3–0)	**Rodriguez (7-2)**	Torres (4)	579	35–21	2–2	

Legend: = Win = Loss = Canceled
Bold = Hawaii team member * Non-conference game
Rankings are based on the team's current ranking in the D1Baseball poll.

== Rankings ==
Ranking movements Legend: ██ Increase in ranking ██ Decrease in ranking — = Not ranked RV = Received votes
	Week																		
Poll	Pre	1	2	3	4	5	6	7	8	9	10	11	12	13	14	15	16	17	Final
Coaches'	RV	RV*	RV	RV	—	RV	RV	RV	RV	RV	—	—	—	—	—	—	—		
Baseball America	—	—	—	—	—	—	—	—	—	—	—	—	—	—	—	—	—		
NCBWA†	—	—	RV	RV	RV	RV	RV	RV	RV	RV	RV	RV	RV	RV	RV	RV	RV		
D1Baseball	—	—	—	—	—	—	—	—	—	—	—	—	—	—	—	—	—		
Perfect Game	—	—	—	—	—	—	—	—	—	—	—	—	—	—	—	—	—		

† NCBWA ranks 30 teams in their preseason poll, but only ranks 25 teams weekly during the season.
* A new poll was not released for this week, so for comparison purposes, the previous week's ranking is inserted in this week's slot.
