= 2025 UC Santa Barbara Gauchos baseball team =

Baseball team season

2025 UC Santa Barbara Gauchos baseball

Tony Gwynn Legacy Series champions
- Conference: Big West Conference
- Record: 36–18 (16–14 Big West)
- Head coach: Andrew Checketts (14th season)
- Associate head coach: Matt Fonteno (6th season)
- Assistant coach: Kyle Hunt (1st season)
- Pitching coach: Dylan Jones (6th season)
- Home stadium: Caesar Uyesaka Stadium

2025 Big West Conference baseball standings
	Conf.						Overall
Team	W		L		T	PCT	W		L		T	PCT
No. 25 UC Irvine ‍†‍‍^{y}	24	–	6	–	0	.800	43	–	17	–	0	.717
Cal Poly ‍‍‡‍^{y}	23	–	7	–	0	.767	43	–	19	–	0	.694
Cal State Fullerton ‍‍‍	19	–	11	–	0	.633	29	–	27	–	0	.518
UC Santa Barbara ‍‍‍	16	–	14	–	0	.533	36	–	18	–	0	.667
Hawai'i ‍‍‍	16	–	14	–	0	.533	35	–	21	–	0	.625
UC San Diego ‍‍‍	15	–	15	–	0	.500	26	–	25	–	0	.510
Long Beach State ‍‍‍	15	–	15	–	0	.500	22	–	31	–	0	.415
UC Davis ‍‍‍	13	–	17	–	0	.433	27	–	28	–	0	.491
CSUN ‍‍‍	10	–	20	–	0	.333	15	–	34	–	0	.306
Cal State Bakersfield ‍‍‍	9	–	21	–	0	.300	18	–	38	–	0	.321
UC Riverside ‍‍‍	5	–	25	–	0	.167	16	–	36	–	0	.308
† – Conference champion ‡ – Tournament champion y – Invited to the NCAA tournament As of June 23, 2025; Rankings from D1Baseball

The 2025 UC Santa Barbara Gauchos baseball team represents University of California, Santa Barbara during the 2025 NCAA Division I baseball season. The Gauchos play their home games at Caesar Uyesaka Stadium as a member of the Big West Conference. They are led by head coach Andrew Checketts, in his fourteenth year as head coach.

== Preseason ==
=== Coaches poll ===
The coaches poll was released on February 7, 2025. UCSB was selected to win the conference.

Coaches' Poll
Predicted finish	Team	Points
1	UCSB	99 (9)
2	UC Irvine	89 (2)
3	Cal Poly	79
4	Hawaii	76
5	UC San Diego	63
6	CSUN	50
7	UC Davis	47
T−8	Cal State Fullerton	36
T−8	Long Beach State	36
10	Cal State Bakersfield	18
11	UC Riverside	12

== Personnel ==
=== Starters ===
Lineup
Pos.	No.	Player.	Year
C			
1B			
2B			
3B			
SS			
LF			
CF			
RF			
DH			

Weekend pitching rotation
Day	No.	Player.	Year
Friday			
Saturday			
Sunday			

== Game log ==
2025 UC Santa Barbara Gauchos baseball game log (30–16)
Regular season (30–16)

February (8–1)
Date	TV	Opponent	Rank	Stadium	Score	Win	Loss	Save	Attendance	Overall	BWC
February 14	ESPN+	Campbell*	No. 22	Caesar Uyesaka Stadium; Santa Barbara, CA	**W** 6–1	**Krodel** (1–0)	Murray (0–1)	**Tryba** (1)	709	1–0	—
February 15	ESPN+	Campbell*	No. 22	Caesar Uyesaka Stadium	**W** 7–2	**Flora** (1–0)	Rossow (0–1)	**Jackson** (1)	932	2–0	—
February 16	ESPN+	Campbell*	No. 22	Caesar Uyesaka Stadium	**W** 14–4	**Hoover** (1–0)	Grubich (0–1)	None	585	3–0	—
February 18	ESPN+	Saint Mary's (CA)	No. 21	Caesar Uyesaka Stadium	**L** 5–1	Gardini (1–0)	**Moring** (0–1)	Santiago (1)	496	3–1	—
Tony Gwynn Legacy Series
February 21		vs. Seattle U*	No. 21	Triton Ballpark; La Jolla, CA	**W** 9–3	**Jackson** (1–0)	Smith (0–2)	None	422	4–1	—
February 22	MW Network	at San Diego State*	No. 21	Tony Gwynn Stadium; San Diego, CA	**W** 7–5	**Peterson** (1–0)	Young (0–1)	None	1,751	5–1	—
February 23		vs. Cal Baptist*	No. 21	Tony Gwynn Stadium	**W** 6–3	**Prosky** (1–0)	New (1–1)	**Hoover (1)**	338	6–1	—
February 25	ESPN+	at Pepperdine*	No. 20	Eddy D. Field Stadium; Malibu, CA	**W** 13–2	**Moring** (1–0)	Rios (0–1)	None	181	7–1	—
February 28	ESPN+	Fresno State*	No. 20	Caesar Uyesaka Stadium	**W** 3–1	**Bremner** (1–0)	Anker (2–1)	**Hoover** (2)	556	8–1	—

March (9–8)
Date	TV	Opponent	Rank	Stadium	Score	Win	Loss	Save	Attendance	Overall	BWC
March 1	ESPN+	Fresno State*	No. 20	Caesar Uyesaka Stadium	**W** 8–7 (10)	**Froling** (1–0)	Anderson (0–2)	None	679	9–1	—
March 2	ESPN+	Fresno State*	No. 20	Caesar Uyesaka Stadium	**L** 1–2	Cremarosa (2–2)	**Proskey** (1–1)	Hay (1)	621	9–2	—
March 4	B1G+	at USC*	No. 16	George C. Page Stadium; Los Angeles, CA	**W** 8–1	**Aceves** (1–0)	Baker (0–1)	None	291	10–2	—
March 7	ESPN+	CSUN	No. 16	Caesar Uyesaka Stadium	**W** 4–3 (13)	**Jackson** (2–0)	Hernandez (0–1)	None	667	11–2	1–0
March 8	ESPN+	CSUN	No. 16	Caesar Uyesaka Stadium	**W** 11–9	**Olivas** (1–0)	Davis (0–2)	**Aceves** (1)	821	12–2	2–0
March 9	ESPN+	CSUN	No. 16	Caesar Uyesaka Stadium	**W** 10–9	**Jackson** (3–0)	Hall (0–1)	None	635	13–2	3–0
March 11	ESPN+	San Diego*	No. 15	Caesar Uyesaka Stadium	**W** 8–4	**Hoover** (2–0)	Giordano (0–1)	**Gallegos** (1)	531	14–2	—
March 14	ESPN+	at Hawaii	No. 15	Les Murakami Stadium; Honolulu, HI	**W** 2–1	**Bremner** (2–0)	Takemoto (1–3)	**Jackson** (2)	3,948	15–2	4–0
March 15	ESPN+	at Hawaii	No. 15	Les Murakami Stadium	**L** 5–17	Rodriguez (2–0)	**Flora** (1–1)	Magdaleno (2)	4,421	15–3	4–1
March 16	ESPN+	at Hawaii	No. 15	Les Murakami Stadium	**L** 0–1	Walls (2–0)	**Proskey** (1–2)	Magdaleno (3)	3,914	15–4	4–2
March 21	ESPN+	UC Irvine	No. 21	Caesar Uyesaka Stadium	**L** 0–10	Kelly (3–0)	**Bremner** (2–1)	None	997	15–5	4–3
March 22	ESPN+	UC Irvine	No. 21	Caesar Uyesaka Stadium	**L** 3–9	Hansen (4–0)	**Flora** (1–2)	Martin (5)	874	15–6	4–4
March 23	ESPN+	UC Irvine	No. 21	Caesar Uyesaka Stadium	**L** 4–9	Ojeda (4–0)	**Proskey** (1–3)	Martin (6)	698	15–7	4–5
March 25	ESPN+	at Saint Mary's*		Louis Guisto Field; Moraga, CA	**W** 7–2	**Jackson** (4–0)	Joslin (0–2)	None	417	16–7	—
March 28		at Long Beach State		Blair Field; Long Beach, CA	**L** 6–9	Montgomery (5–2)	**Bremner** (2–2)	Roblez (2)	2,443	16–8	4–6
March 29	ESPN+	at Long Beach State		Blair Field	**W** 9–0	**Proskey** (2–3)	Fields (0–1)	None	2,217	17–8	5–6
March 30	ESPN+	at Long Beach State		Blair Field	**L** 4–5	Geiss (3–5)	**Krodel** (1–1)	Roblez (3)	2,815	17–9	5–7

April (3–1)
Date	TV	Opponent	Rank	Stadium	Score	Win	Loss	Save	Attendance	Overall	BWC
April 1	ESPN+	at Loyola Marymount*		George C. Page Stadium	**W** 3–1	**Aceves** (2–0)	Chavez (0–1)	**Tryba** (2)	206	18–9	—
April 4	ESPN+	UC Davis		Caesar Uyesaka Stadium	**L** 0–1	Green (2–2)	**Bremner** (2–3)	Lerma (1)	464	18–10	5–8
April 5	ESPN+	UC Davis		Caesar Uyesaka Stadium	**W** 5–0	**Proskey** (3–3)	Frutchey (1–2)	None	593	19–10	6–8
April 6	ESPN+	UC Davis		Caesar Uyesaka Stadium	**W** 8–2	**Flora** (2–2)	Wood (2–3)	None	607	20–10	7–8
April 8	ESPN+	Pepperdine*		Caesar Uyesaka Stadium							—
April 11	ESPN+	at UC Riverside		Riverside Sports Complex; Riverside, CA							
April 12	ESPN+	at UC Riverside		Riverside Sports Complex							
April 13	ESPN+	at UC Riverside		Riverside Sports Complex							
April 14	ESPN+	at Cal Baptist*		James W. Totman Stadium; El Sobrante, CA							—
Blue–Green Series
April 17	ESPN+	Cal Poly		Caesar Uyesaka Stadium							
April 18	ESPNU	Cal Poly		Caesar Uyesaka Stadium							
April 19	ESPN+	Cal Poly		Caesar Uyesaka Stadium							
April 21	ESPN+	Cal Baptist*		Caesar Uyesaka Stadium							—
April 25	ESPN+	at UC San Diego		Triton Ballpark							
April 26	ESPN+	at UC San Diego		Triton Ballpark							
April 27	ESPN+	at UC San Diego		Triton Ballpark							
April 28	ESPN+	at San Diego*		Fowler Park; San Diego, CA							—

May (0–0)
Date	TV	Opponent	Rank	Stadium	Score	Win	Loss	Save	Attendance	Overall	BWC
May 2	ESPN+	at Cal State Fullerton		Goodwin Field; Fullerton, CA							
May 3	ESPN+	at Cal State Fullerton		Goodwin Field							
May 4	ESPN+	at Cal State Fullerton		Goodwin Field							
May 6	ESPN+	No. 25 USC*		Caesar Uyesaka Stadium							—
May 9	ESPN+	at Loyola Marymount*		George C. Page Stadium							—
May 10	ESPN+	Loyola Marymount*		Caesar Uyesaka Stadium							—
May 11	ESPN+	Loyola Marymount*		Caesar Uyesaka Stadium							—
May 15	ESPN+	Cal State Bakersfield		Caesar Uyesaka Stadium							
May 16	ESPN+	Cal State Bakersfield		Caesar Uyesaka Stadium							
May 17	ESPN+	Cal State Bakersfield		Caesar Uyesaka Stadium							

Postseason (0–0)

Big West tournament (0–0)
Date	TV	Opponent	Rank	Stadium	Score	Win	Loss	Save	Attendance	Overall	BWCT Record	Source
May 21–25	ESPN+			Goodwin Field								

Legend: = Win = Loss = Canceled
Bold = UCSB team member * Non-conference game
Rankings are based on the team's current ranking in the D1Baseball poll.

== Rankings ==
Ranking movements Legend: ██ Increase in ranking ██ Decrease in ranking — = Not ranked RV = Received votes
	Week																		
Poll	Pre	1	2	3	4	5	6	7	8	9	10	11	12	13	14	15	16	17	Final
Coaches'	22	22*	19	15	17	21	RV	RV	RV	RV	—	—	—	—	—	—			
Baseball America	23	22	21	25	24	—	—	—	—	—	—	—	—	—	—	—			
NCBWA†	25	20	18	18	17	15	RV	RV	RV	RV	RV	RV	RV	RV	RV	RV			
D1Baseball	22	21	20	16	15	21	—	—	—	—	—	—	—	—	—	—			
Perfect Game	24	22	22	22	20	—	—	—	—	—	—	—	—	—	—	—			

† NCBWA ranks 30 teams in their preseason poll, but only ranks 25 teams weekly during the season.
* A new poll was not released for this week, so for comparison purposes, the previous week's ranking is inserted in this week's slot.
