= 2025 Big West Conference baseball tournament =

American college baseball tournament

- Teams: 5
- Format: Double-elimination tournament
- Finals site: Goodwin Field; Fullerton, CA
- Champions: Cal Poly (1st title)
- Winning coach: Larry Lee (1st title)
- MVP: Ryan Fenn (Cal Poly)
- Television: ESPN+

2025 Big West Conference baseball standings
	Conf.						Overall
Team	W		L		T	PCT	W		L		T	PCT
No. 25 UC Irvine ‍†‍‍^{y}	24	–	6	–	0	.800	43	–	17	–	0	.717
Cal Poly ‍‍‡‍^{y}	23	–	7	–	0	.767	43	–	19	–	0	.694
Cal State Fullerton ‍‍‍	19	–	11	–	0	.633	29	–	27	–	0	.518
UC Santa Barbara ‍‍‍	16	–	14	–	0	.533	36	–	18	–	0	.667
Hawai'i ‍‍‍	16	–	14	–	0	.533	35	–	21	–	0	.625
UC San Diego ‍‍‍	15	–	15	–	0	.500	26	–	25	–	0	.510
Long Beach State ‍‍‍	15	–	15	–	0	.500	22	–	31	–	0	.415
UC Davis ‍‍‍	13	–	17	–	0	.433	27	–	28	–	0	.491
CSUN ‍‍‍	10	–	20	–	0	.333	15	–	34	–	0	.306
Cal State Bakersfield ‍‍‍	9	–	21	–	0	.300	18	–	38	–	0	.321
UC Riverside ‍‍‍	5	–	25	–	0	.167	16	–	36	–	0	.308
† – Conference champion ‡ – Tournament champion y – Invited to the NCAA tournament As of June 23, 2025; Rankings from D1Baseball

The 2025 Big West Conference baseball tournament determined the conference champion for the Big West Conference at the end of the 2025 college baseball season. The top five teams met at Cal State Fullerton's on campus venue, Goodwin Field from May 21 through 24. This was the first Big West Conference postseason championship event since the 1998 season, ending a 27-year hiatus. The Cal Poly Mustangs won the championship, defeating UC Irvine in back-to-back elimination games, receiving the conference's automatic bid. UC Irvine also received an at-large bid. Both teams went 2-2 in the tournament, losing in their respective regional final.

== Seeding and format ==
The top five finishers from the regular season were seeded one through five based on conference winning percentage. Seeds No. 1, No. 2, and No. 3 received a bye into the double elimination bracket, while No. 4 and No. 5 battled in a single elimination the first round.

Seed	School	Record	Tiebreaker
1	UC Irvine	24-6	
2	Cal Poly	23-7	
3	Cal State Fullerton	19-11	
4	Hawai'i	16-14	2-1 vs. UC Santa Barbara
5	UC Santa Barbara	16-14	1-2 vs. Hawai'i
DNQ	UC San Diego	15-15	2-1 vs. Long Beach State
DNQ	Long Beach State	15-15	1-2 vs. UC San Diego
DNQ	UC Davis	13-17	
DNQ	CSUN	10-20	
DNQ	CSU Bakersfield	9-21	
DNQ	UC Riverside	5-25	

== Bracket ==
Round 1
4	Hawai'i	6
5	UC Santa Barbara	2

Round 2
1	UC Irvine	7
4	Hawai'i	5
2	Cal Poly	7
3	Cal State Fullerton	2
Lower round 2
4	Hawai'i	16
3	Cal State Fullerton	4

Upper final
1	UC Irvine	15 (7)
2	Cal Poly	3
Lower final
2	Cal Poly	2
4	Hawai'i	1

Finals
1	UC Irvine	5	4
2	Cal Poly	15 (8)	6

== Schedule ==
Game	Time*	Matchup^{#}	Score	Notes	Reference
Wednesday, May 21
1	12:00 pm	No. 5 UC Santa Barbara vs No. 4 Hawaii	2–6	UC Santa Barbara Eliminated	
Thursday, May 22
2	3:00 pm	No. 4 Hawaii vs No. 1 UC Irvine	5–7		
3	7:00 pm	No. 3 Cal State Fullerton vs No. 2 Cal Poly	2–7		
Friday, May 23
4	3:00 pm	No. 2 Cal Poly vs No. 1 UC Irvine	3–15 ^{(7)}		
5	7:00 pm	No. 4 Hawai'i vs No. 3 Cal State Fullerton	16–4	Cal State Fullerton Eliminated	
Saturday, May 24
6	3:00 pm	No. 4 Hawai'i vs No. 2 Cal Poly	1-2	Hawai'i Eliminated	
7	7:00 pm	No. 2 Cal Poly vs No. 1 UC Irvine	15-5 (8)		
Sunday, May 25
8	3:00 pm	No. 2 Cal Poly vs. No. 1 UC Irvine	6-4	UC Irvine eliminated	

== All-Tournament Team ==
The following players were members of the Big West Conference All-Tournament Team.

Position	Player	School
P	Chris Downs	Cal Poly
P	Trevor Hansen	UC Irvine
P	Isaiah Magdaleno	Hawai'i
P	Griffin Naess	Cal Poly
C	Blake Penso	UC Irvine
1B	Ben Zeigler-Namoa	Hawai'i
2B	Ryan Fenn (MVP)	Cal Poly
3B	Zach Daudet	Cal Poly
SS	Maddox Latta	Cal State Fullerton
OF	Matthew Bardowell	Cal State Fullerton
OF	LeTrey McCollum	UC Santa Barbara
OF	Jacob McCombs	UC Irvine
