= Northern California Baseball Association =

College sports conference, 1977–1984

The Northern California Baseball Association or NCBA was a baseball-only conference that existed from 1977 to 1984. It was made up of schools from the Big West Conference, then the Pacific Coast Athletic Association (PCAA), and West Coast Conference, then the West Coast Athletic Conference (WCAC). In 1977, the PCAA and WCAC realigned themselves for baseball-only into a north conference (NCBA) and south conference (SCBA). Throughout the eight years of NCBA/SCBA alignment, seven teams competed in the NCBA; all participated in all of the league's seasons except Nevada, which left after the 1983 season. All league titles were claimed by Fresno State or Santa Clara.

== Member schools ==
| Institution | Location (Note: All cities are located within the State of California, unless noted in parentheses the state where the institution is located by that city.) | Founded | Affiliation | Nickname | Joined (Note: Represents the calendar year when fall sports competition begins.) | Left (Note: Represents the calendar year when spring sports competition ends.) | Primary conference for other sports at the moment | NCAA baseball tournament appearances | CWS appearances |
|---|---|---|---|---|---|---|---|---|---|
| California State University, Fresno (Fresno State) | Fresno | 1911 | Public | Titans | 1976 | 1984 | Pacific Coast (PCAA) (Note: Currently known as the Big West Conference (BWC).) (Note: Later left to join the Western Athletic Conference (WAC); then left to join the Mountain West Conference (MW); now currently in the Pac-12 Conference.) | 31 | 4 |
| University of Nevada, Reno (Nevada) | Reno (Nevada) | 1874 | Public | Wolf Pack | 1976 | 1983 | D-I Independent (Note: Later left to join the Big West Conference (BWC); then left to join the Western Athletic Conference (WAC); now currently in the Mountain West Conference (MW).) | 4 | 0 |
| University of the Pacific (Pacific) | Stockton | 1851 | United; Methodist | Tigers | 1976 | 1984 | Pacific Coast (PCAA) (Note: Now currently in the West Coast Conference (WCC).) | 0 | 0 |
| Saint Mary's College of California | Moraga | 1863 | Catholic (F.S.C.) | Gaels | 1976 | 1984 | West Coast (WCAC) (Note: Currently known as the West Coast Conference (WCC).) | 0 | 0 |
| University of San Francisco | San Francisco | 1855 | Catholic (Jesuit) | Tigers | 1976 | 1984 | West Coast (WCAC) | 1 | 0 |
| San Jose State University | San Jose | 1857 | Public | Spartans | 1976 | 1984 | Pacific Coast (PCAA) (Note: Later left to join the Western Athletic Conference (WAC); now currently in the Mountain West Conference (MW).) | 4 | 1 |
| Santa Clara University | Santa Clara | 1851 | Catholic (Jesuit) | Broncos | 1977 | 1984 | West Coast (WCAC) | 11 | 1 |
