= 1998 Big West Conference baseball tournament =

American college baseball tournament

- Teams: 6
- Format: Double-elimination tournament
- Finals site: Titan Field; Fullerton, CA
- Champions: Long Beach State (1st title)
- Winning coach: Dave Snow (1st title)

1998 Big West Conference baseball standings
	Conf.				Overall
Team	W		L	PCT	W		L	PCT
Northern
Nevada ^{x}‍‍‍	17	–	10	.630	31	–	22	.585
Sacramento State ‍‍‍	15	–	19	.441	23	–	25	.479
Pacific ‍‍‍	12	–	17	.414	25	–	22	.532
New Mexico State ‍‍‍	8	–	21	.276	23	–	29	.442
Southern
No. 11 Cal State Fullerton ^{x}‍‍‍	25	–	5	.833	47	–	17	.734
No. 4 Long Beach State ‍‍‡‍	23	–	7	.767	37	–	20	.649
UC Santa Barbara ‍‍‍	11	–	18	.379	18	–	30	.375
Cal Poly ‍‍‍	7	–	21	.250	16	–	42	.276
† – Conference champion ‡ – Tournament champion y – Invited to the 1998 NCAA Division I baseball tournament As of June 30, 1985; Rankings from Collegiate Baseball

The 1998 Big West Conference baseball tournament determined the conference champion for the Big West Conference at the end of the 1998 season. The six teams met at Cal State Fullerton's on campus venue, Titan Field from May 14 through 17. This would be the last Big West Conference postseason championship event, as the tournament was discontinued after the 1998 season. However, the tournament was reinstated for the 2025 season after a 27-year hiatus.

== Seeding and format ==
The top team from each of the conference's two divisions after the regular season received the top two seeds, while the four teams with the highest conference winning percentage regardless of division were seeded three through six in the double-elimination tournament.

Team	W	L	PCT	GB	Seed
North Division
Nevada	17	10	.630	–	2
Sacramento State	15	19	.441	5.5	4
Pacific	12	17	.414	6	5
New Mexico State	8	21	.276	10	–
South Division
Cal State Fullerton	25	5	.833	–	1
Long Beach State	23	7	.767	2	3
UC Santa Barbara	11	18	.379	13.5	6
Cal Poly	7	21	.250	17	–

== Bracket ==
The bracket below depicts the results of the tournament.

First round
1	Cal State Fullerton	4
6	UC Santa Barbara	2
3	Long Beach State	8
4	Sacramento State	7
2	Nevada	29
5	Pacific	1

Second round
1	Cal State Fullerton	5
4	Sacramento State	6
6	UC Santa Barbara	3
5	Pacific	2
3	Long Beach State	6
2	Nevada	5
1	Cal State Fullerton	6
2	Nevada	3

Third round
4	Sacramento State	15
6	UC Santa Barbara	11
3	Long Beach State	12
1	Cal State Fullerton	0

Final
4	Sacramento State	10	—
3	Long Beach State	24	—

== Tournament notes ==
- Nevada's 29 runs are a tournament record
