= Robin Baggett Stadium =

College baseball stadium in California, U.S.

Baggett Stadium
- Baggett Stadium
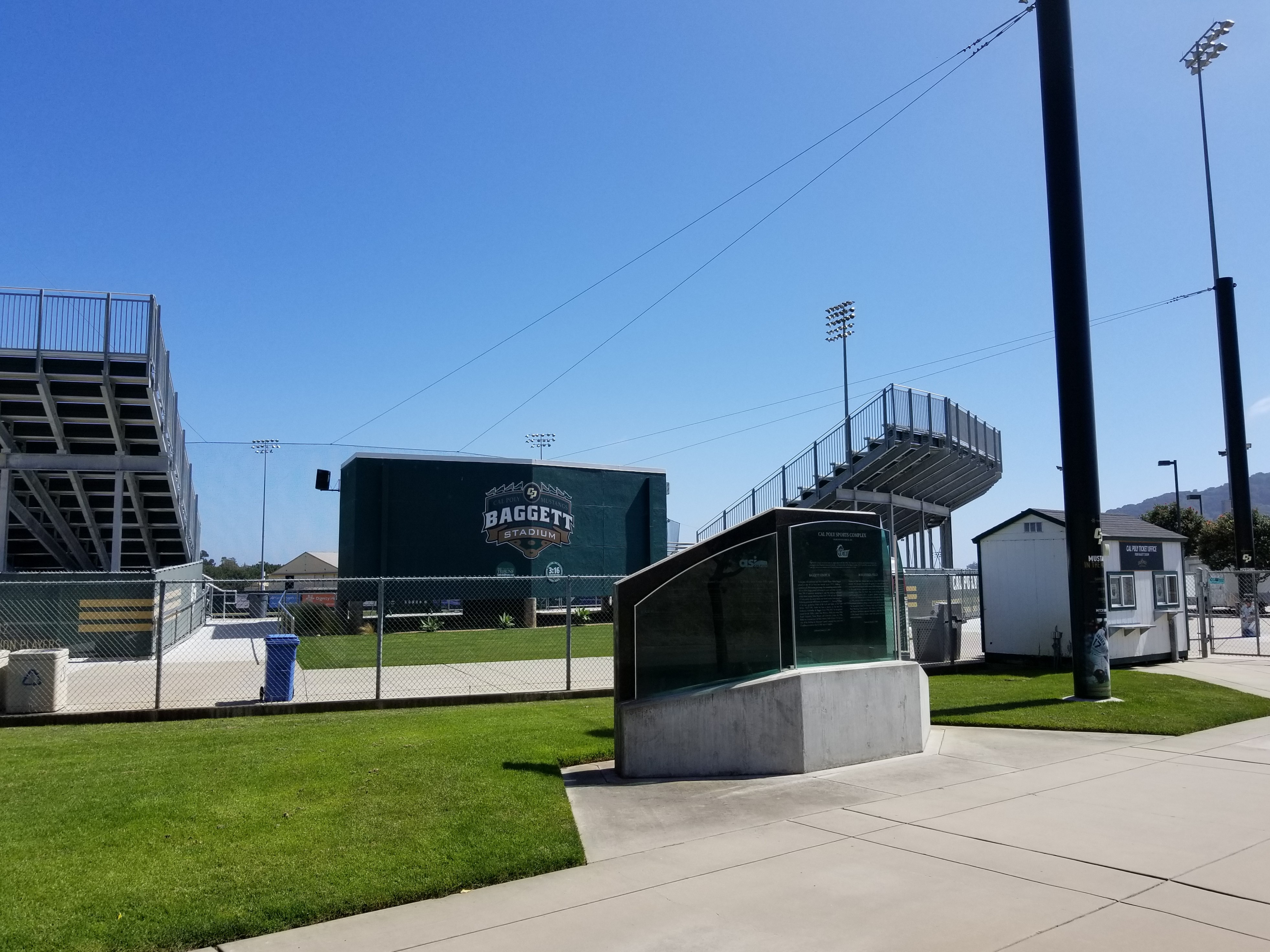
- The original Baggett Stadium entrance and press box are shown in 2019 prior to renovations.
- Interactive map of Baggett Stadium
- Location: San Luis Obispo, California, U.S.
- Coordinates: 35.307112°N 120.665368°W
- Owner: California Polytechnic State University
- Operator: Cal Poly
- Capacity: 3,138 (768 chairback, 2,370 permanent bleacher seats)
- Executive suites: Krukow's Klubhouse
- Surface: Natural grass
- Record attendance: 3,284 vs Cal State Fullerton May 6, 2005
- Field size: 335 ft (102 m) (lines), 385 ft (117 m) (gaps), 405 ft (123 m) (CF)

Construction
- Built: 2001
- Opened: January 21, 2001
- Renovated: 2018
- Expanded: 2018
- Cost: $12 million $8 million (2018 expansion & renovation)
- Architects: Edwin S. Darden Associates, Inc., DLR Group (2018 expansion & renovation)
- General contractors: R. Burke, Specialty Construction; Vernon Edwards Constructors, United Utilities

Tenant
- Cal Poly Mustangs baseball (NCAA DI Big West) (2001–present)

Baggett Stadium (also sometimes called Robin Baggett Stadium) is a baseball venue located on the campus of California Polytechnic State University, San Luis Obispo in San Luis Obispo, California, United States. It is home to the Cal Poly Mustangs baseball team, a member of the Division I Big West Conference. The stadium is named for Robin Baggett, a former baseball player at Cal Poly, and his wife Barbara.

== History ==
=== Construction and first 15 years ===
The stadium opened on January 21, 2001, with the Mustangs defeating #11-ranked Stanford 6–5 in 12 innings in front of a crowd of 3,110 fans. The stadium originally had a usual, day-to-day capacity of 1,734 before later expansion, and is part of an encompassing 47-acre (190,000 m^{2}) Upper Sports Complex which is also home to the Mustang softball team.

Originally, the park's dimensions were 337 feet down the lines, 387 feet in the power alleys and 407 feet to center, with 12-foot fences.

In 2012, college baseball writer Eric Sorenson ranked the field as the fifth-best setting in Division I baseball.

==== Hosting 2014 NCAA Regional ====
In 2014, Cal Poly hosted its first-ever NCAA Tournament Division I Baseball Regional. The regional featured Cal Poly as the #1 seed along with Arizona State, Pepperdine and Sacramento State.

At the time, the stadium was expandable with additional temporary bleachers to a capacity of 3,042. In a matter of minutes after going on sale, Cal Poly quickly sold out its first game of the regional against Sacramento State. Actual attendance peaked Saturday night at 2,941 with Cal Poly's second game despite all 3,042 tickets being sold out.

==== Attendance records ====
- The record attendance for a 3-game regular-season series is 8,727 vs Hawaii from April 11-3, 2025. It eclipsed a mark of 8,585 set vs. then defending National Champion and No. 1-ranked Cal State Fullerton from May 6–8, 2005.
- The May 6, 2005 series opener against CSF also is the single-game record, with a then-standing-room-only crowd of 3,284 in attendance for the Friday night matchup; some 200 fans were forced to be turned away from the game against the defending national champion Titans, although almost a hundred spectators watched from a nearby hill.
- During the 2014 NCAA Regional, Cal Poly tore more than 15,000 total tickets at the stadium.

=== Expansions ===
In November 2012, a 6,000-square-foot lighted hitting area was completed for roughly $300,000, with retractable netting allowing for three long cages alongside three short cages.

In 2018, the university began an $8 million enhancement project at Baggett Stadium. The project included a two-story, 10,000-square-foot clubhouse complete with a lounge and kitchen, meeting and study space, locker room, training room, offices, and a therapeutic cold plunge pool. The previously existing clubhouse, which had stood for 17 years, was demolished on June 11, 2018 by the project's contractor, Exbon Development of Garden Grove, California.

In addition, new permanent seating and backstop safety netting was installed by the start of the 2018 season, raising the capacity to 3,138.

Announced February 13, 2019, a new Daktronics videoboard ranging 36 feet by 20.4 feet was added, with 1,080-by-612 pixel resolution LED lighting.

As part of the almost overall $10 million project, the Dignity Health Baseball Clubhouse was completed in August 2020. Additionally, a $1 million Hoffman Press Box, which provided seating for 20 event staff employees and media members, was completed in April 2021, including two tiered rows of seats, electrical and internet upgrades, and improved sight lines.

In 2022, Cal Poly ranked 38th in the nation in average home attendance, drawing 1,905 fans per game to Baggett Stadium.

On March 25, 2023, Hall of Fame shortstop Ozzie Smith returned to the stadium, as his statue (relocated and upgraded as part of the complex entrance's remodeling) was re-dedicated; the surrounding walkways are now part of Ozzie Smith Plaza.

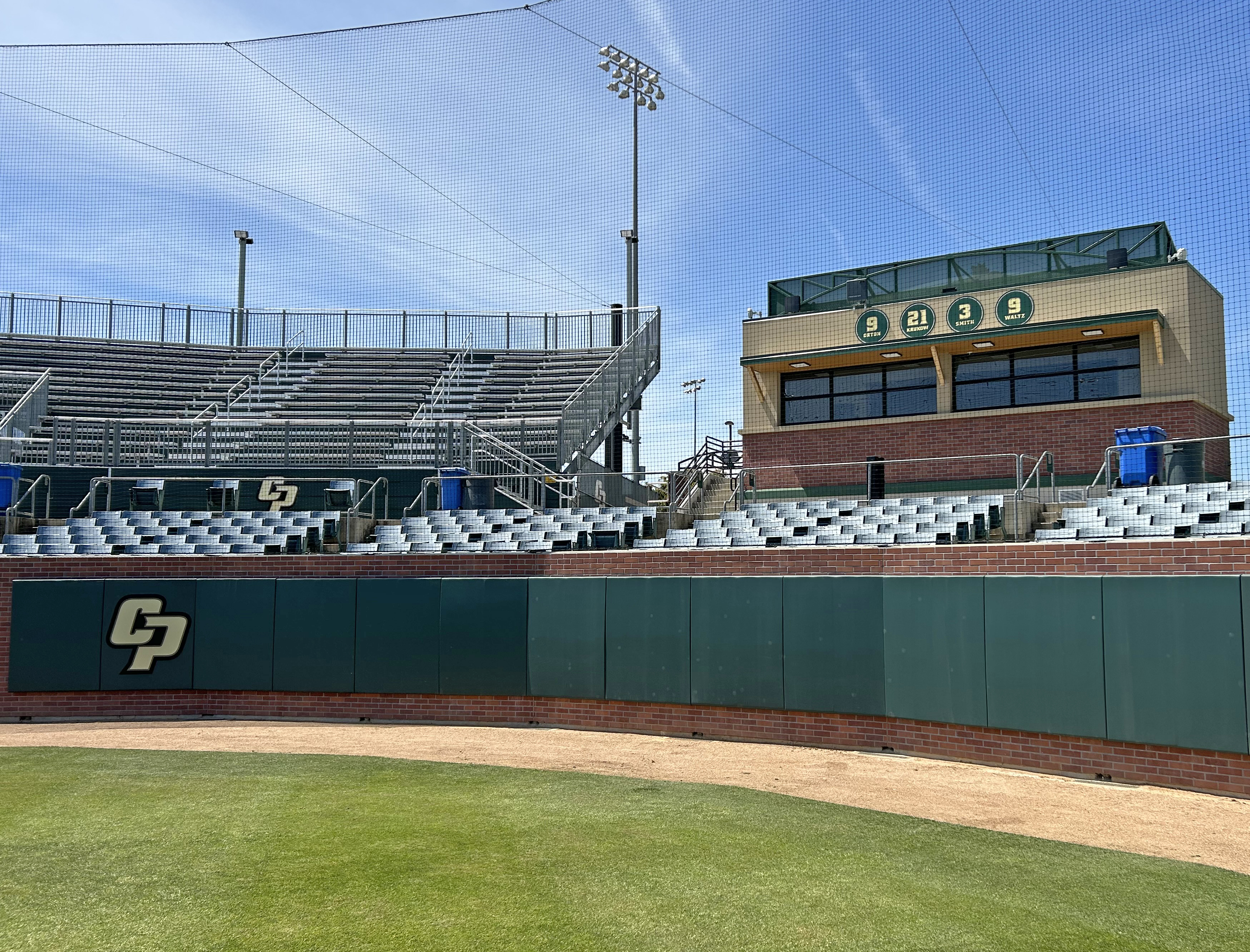
The new Hoffman Press Box at Cal Poly's Baggett Stadium was dedicated in May 2021.

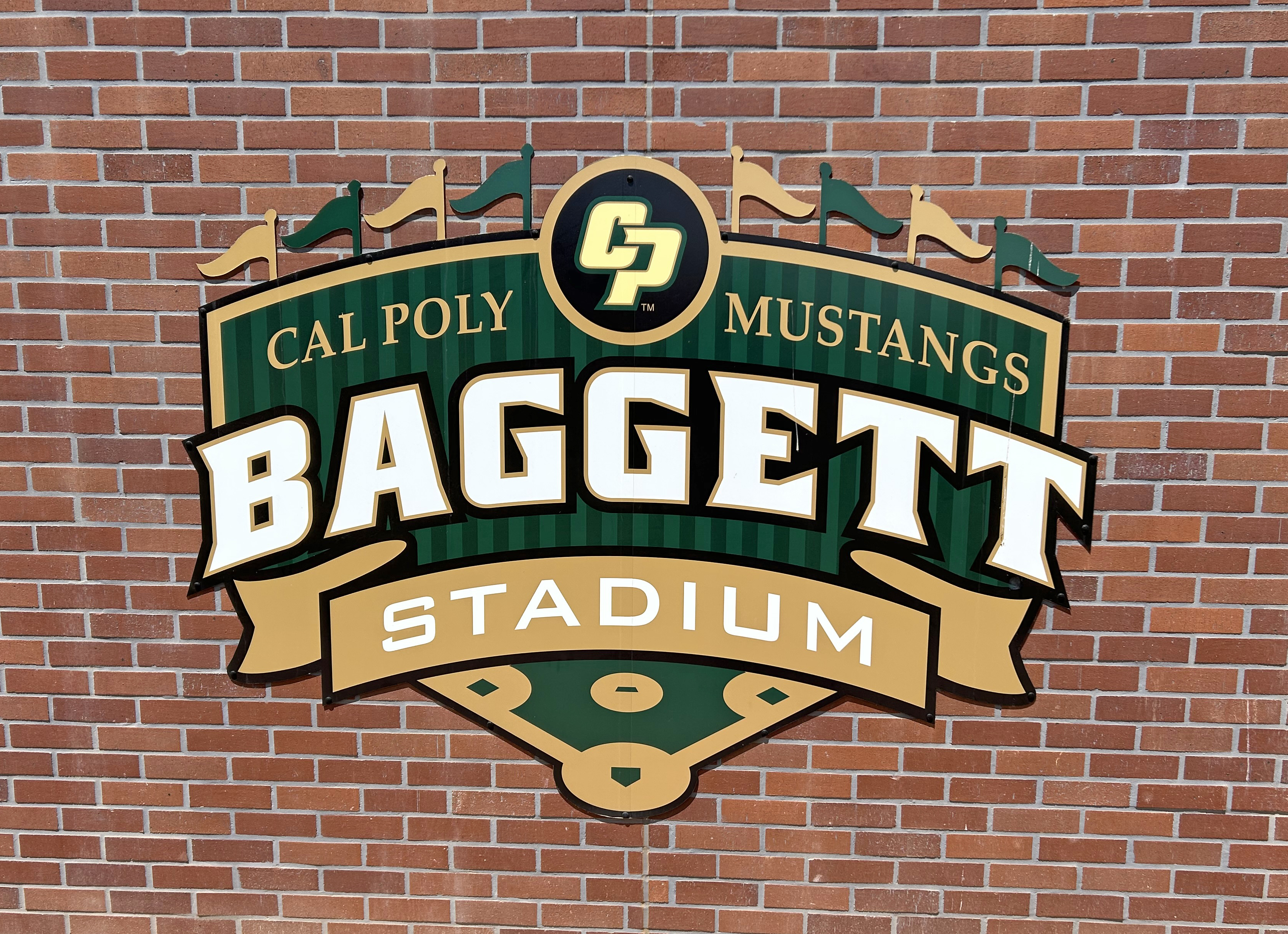
The commemorative Baggett Stadium logo is shown in April 2023.

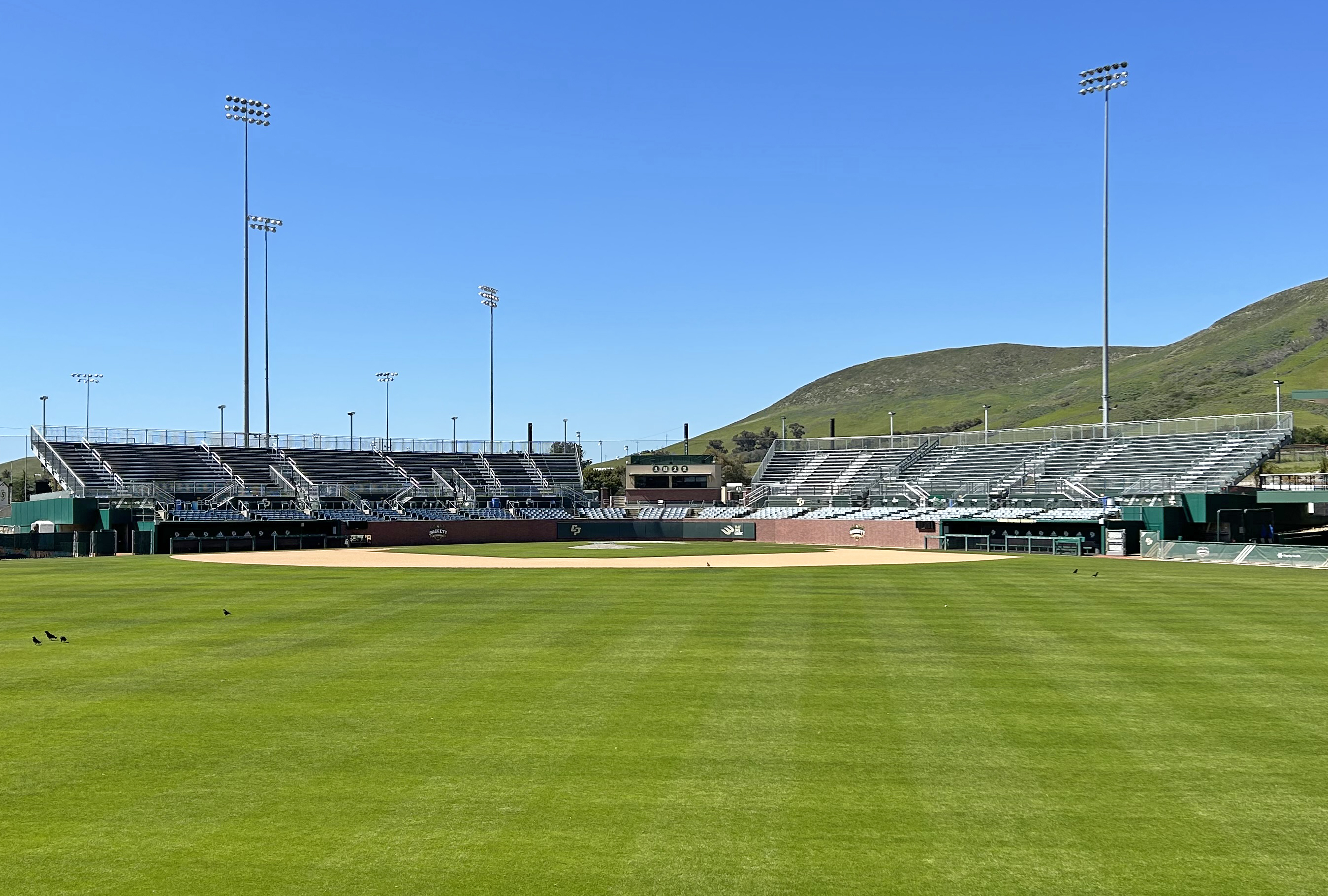
Baggett Stadium, home to the Cal Poly baseball team, is pictured in San Luis Obispo, Calif., in April 2023.

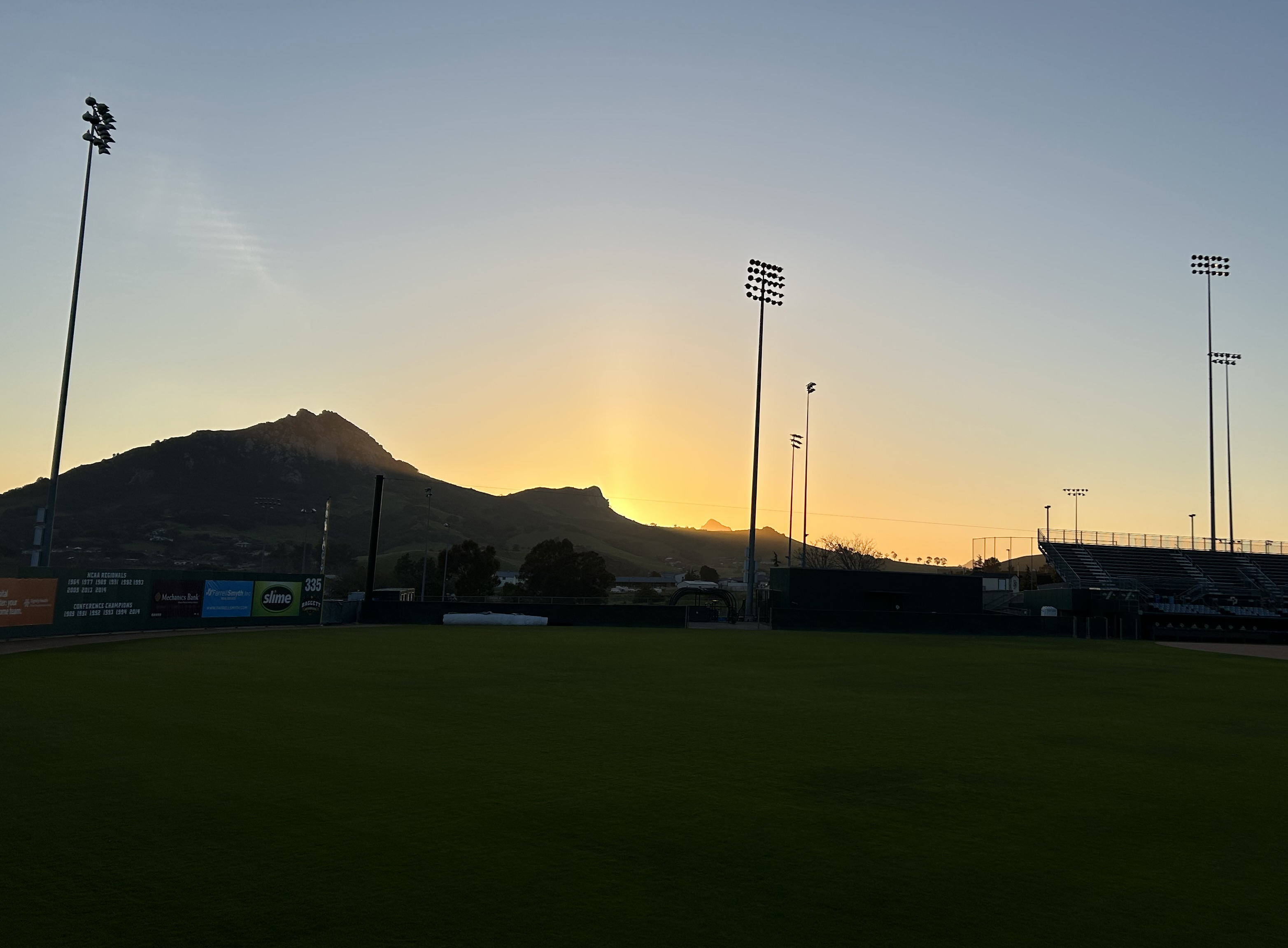
Bishop Peak in San Luis Obispo is visible behind the right-field stands of Cal Poly's Baggett Stadium.

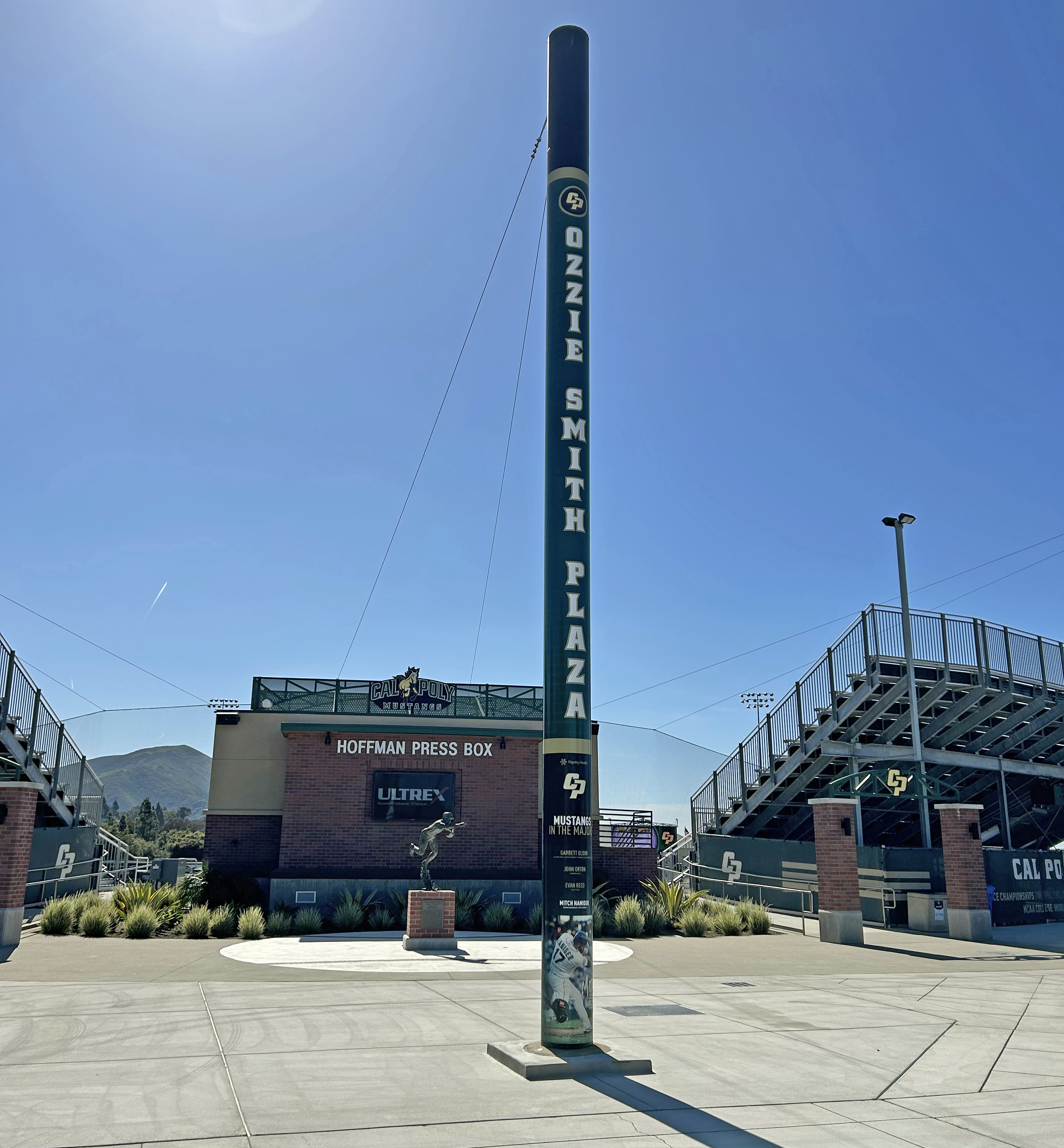
Ozzie Smith Plaza at the entrance to Cal Poly's Baggett Stadium was dedicated during a Mustang baseball series in San Luis Obispo, Calif., in 2023.

== See also ==
- List of NCAA Division I baseball venues
