= Goodwin Field =

Baseball Park of California State University, Fullerton

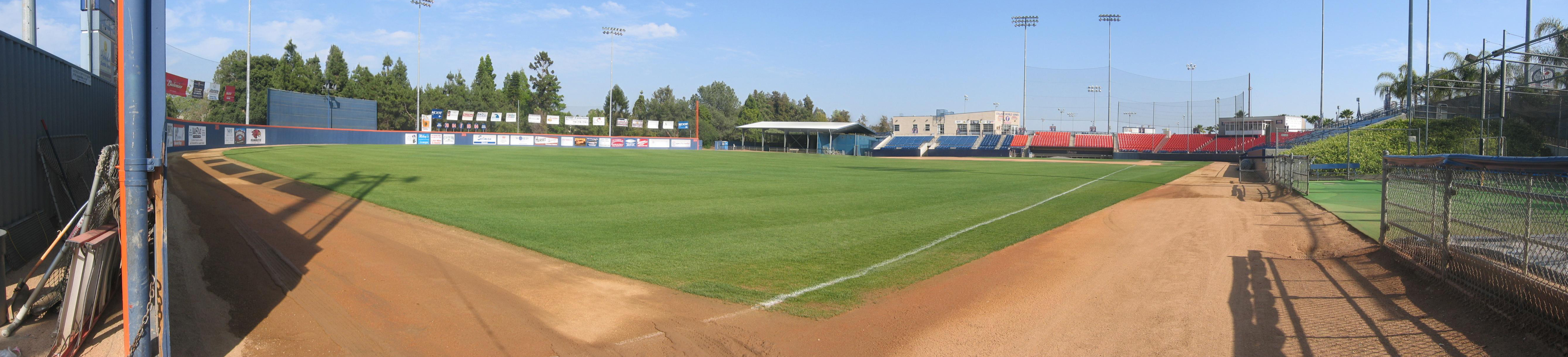
- Interactive map of Goodwin Field
- Full name: Jerry and Merilyn Goodwin Field
- Former names: Titan Field (1992–2000)
- Location: West Campus Drive; Fullerton, California, U.S.
- Coordinates: 33.8866°N 117.8855°W
- Owner: California State University, Fullerton
- Operator: California State University, Fullerton
- Capacity: 3,500
- Scoreboard: Electronic
- Record attendance: 3,554 (May 21, 2005, vs. Long Beach State)
- Field size: 330 ft (101 m) (lines); 385 ft (117 m) (gaps); 400 ft (122 m) (CF)

Construction
- Opened: 1992
- Renovated: 2000, 2006, 2008, 2009, 2010
- Expanded: 2001

Tenants
- Cal State Fullerton Titans football (NCAA) (1980–1982); Cal State Fullerton Titans baseball (NCAA) (1992–present); Fullerton/Orange County Flyers (GBL) (2005–2010)

Goodwin Field is a 3,500-seat baseball park in the western United States, located in Fullerton, California. On the campus of California State University, Fullerton, it is primarily the home field of the four-time national champion CSUF Titans of the NCAA's Big West Conference. It is named for Jerry and Merilyn Goodwin, who gave $1 million toward a $3 million campaign for major renovations.

In 2013, the Titans ranked 29th among Division I baseball programs in attendance, averaging 2,356 per home game.

== Former tenants ==
Goodwin Field is the former home field of the Fullerton/Orange County Flyers minor league baseball team from 2005 to 2010.

== Gallery ==
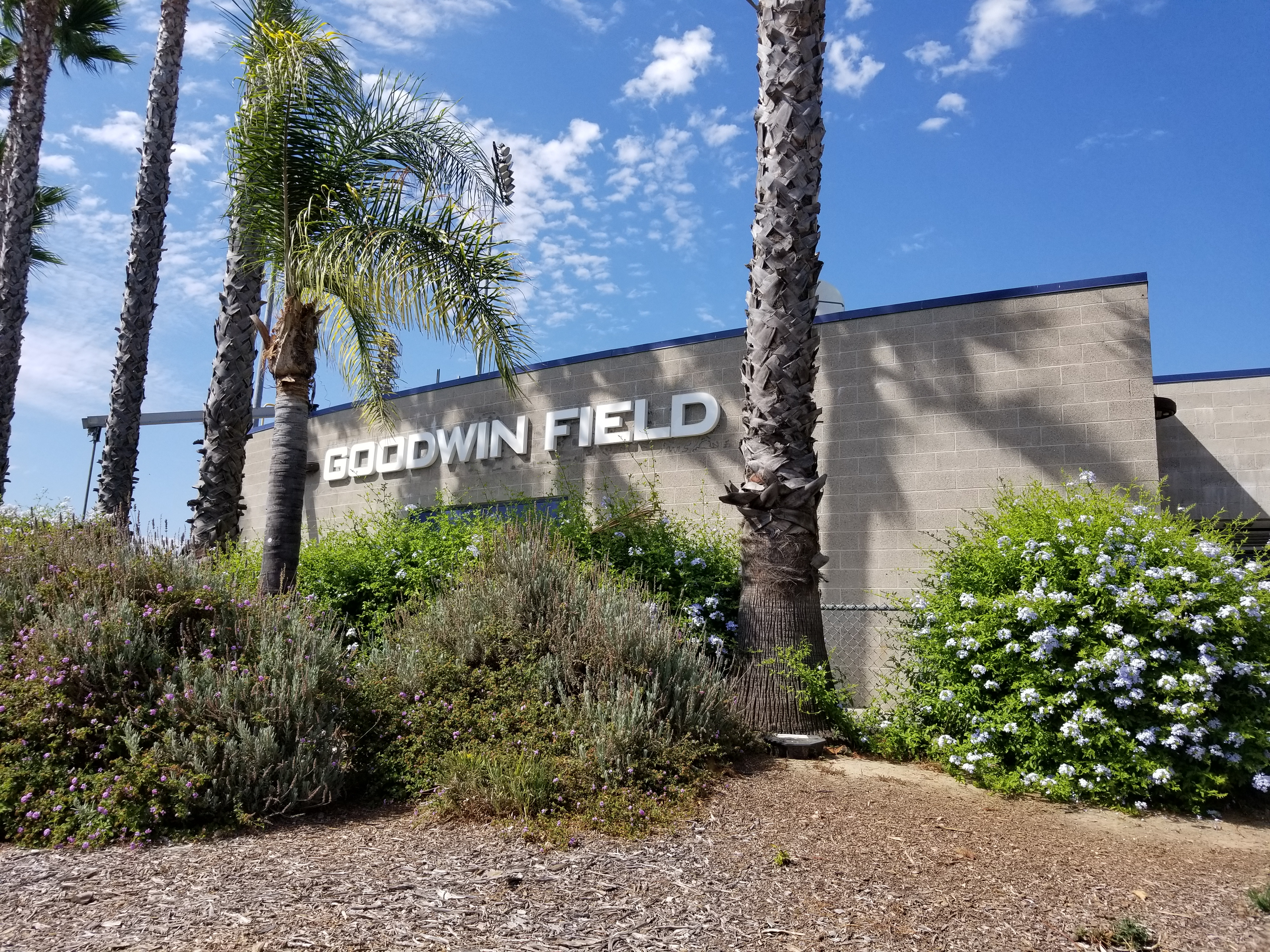
Marquee

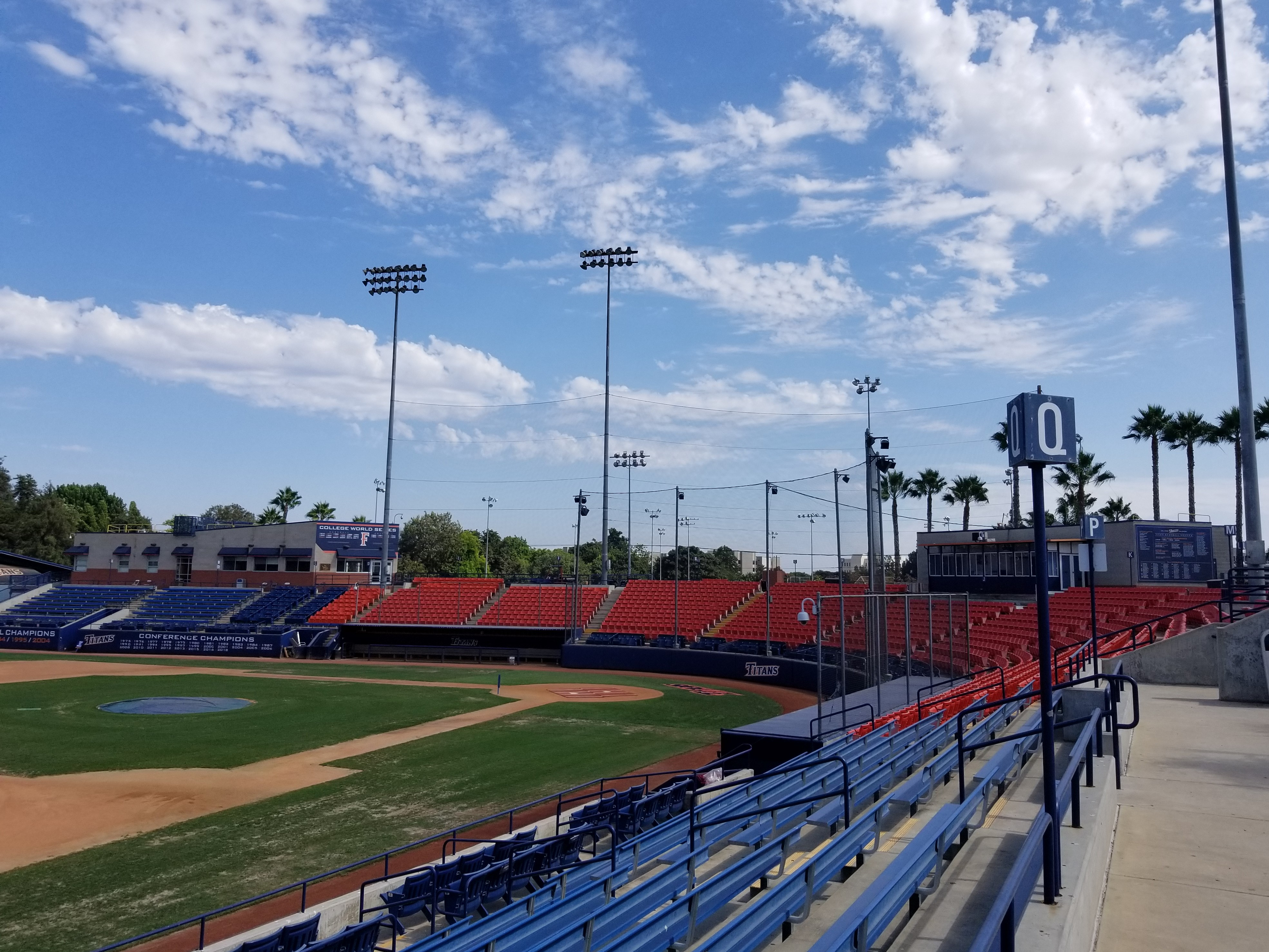
Grandstand

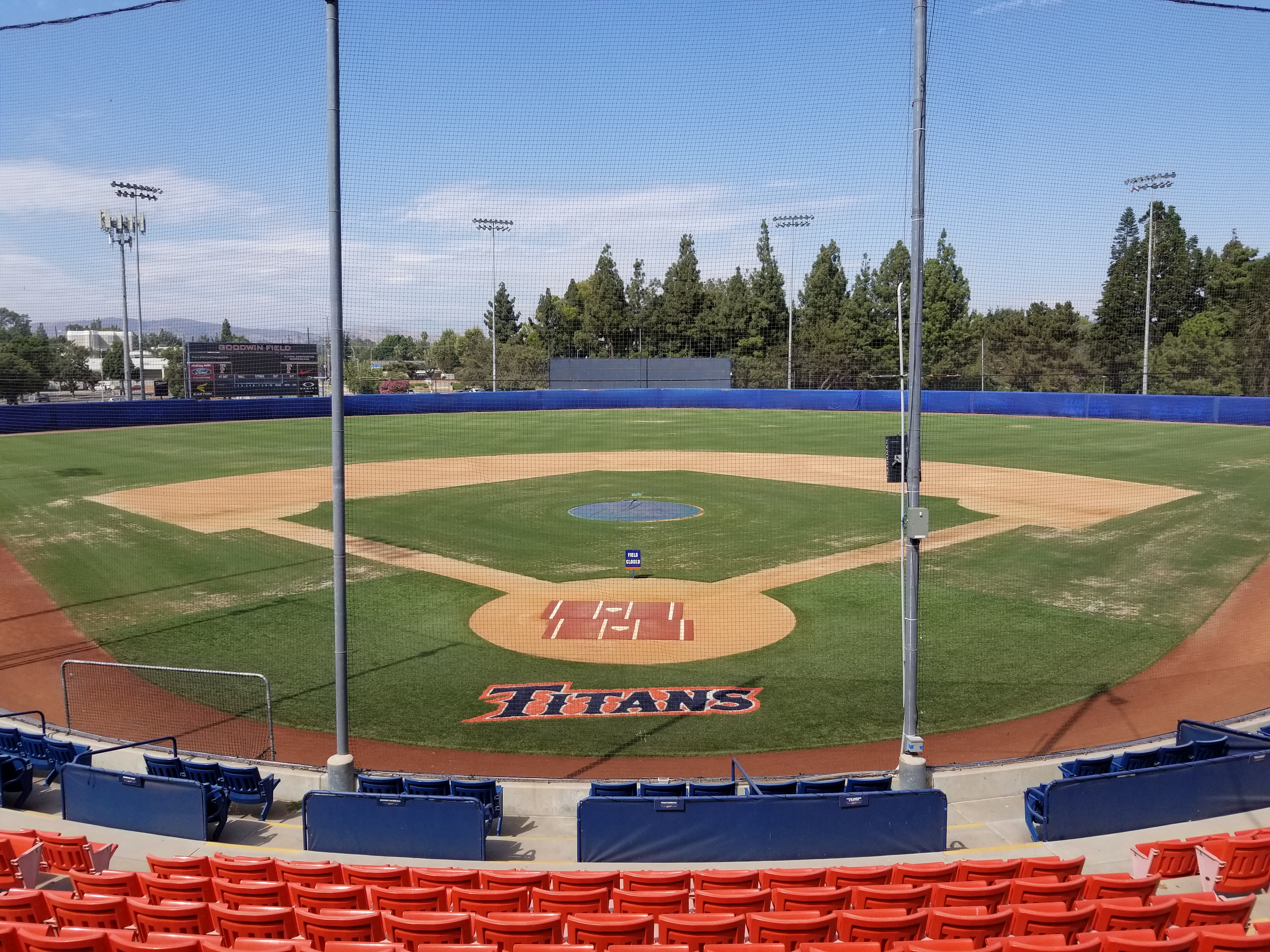
Home plate

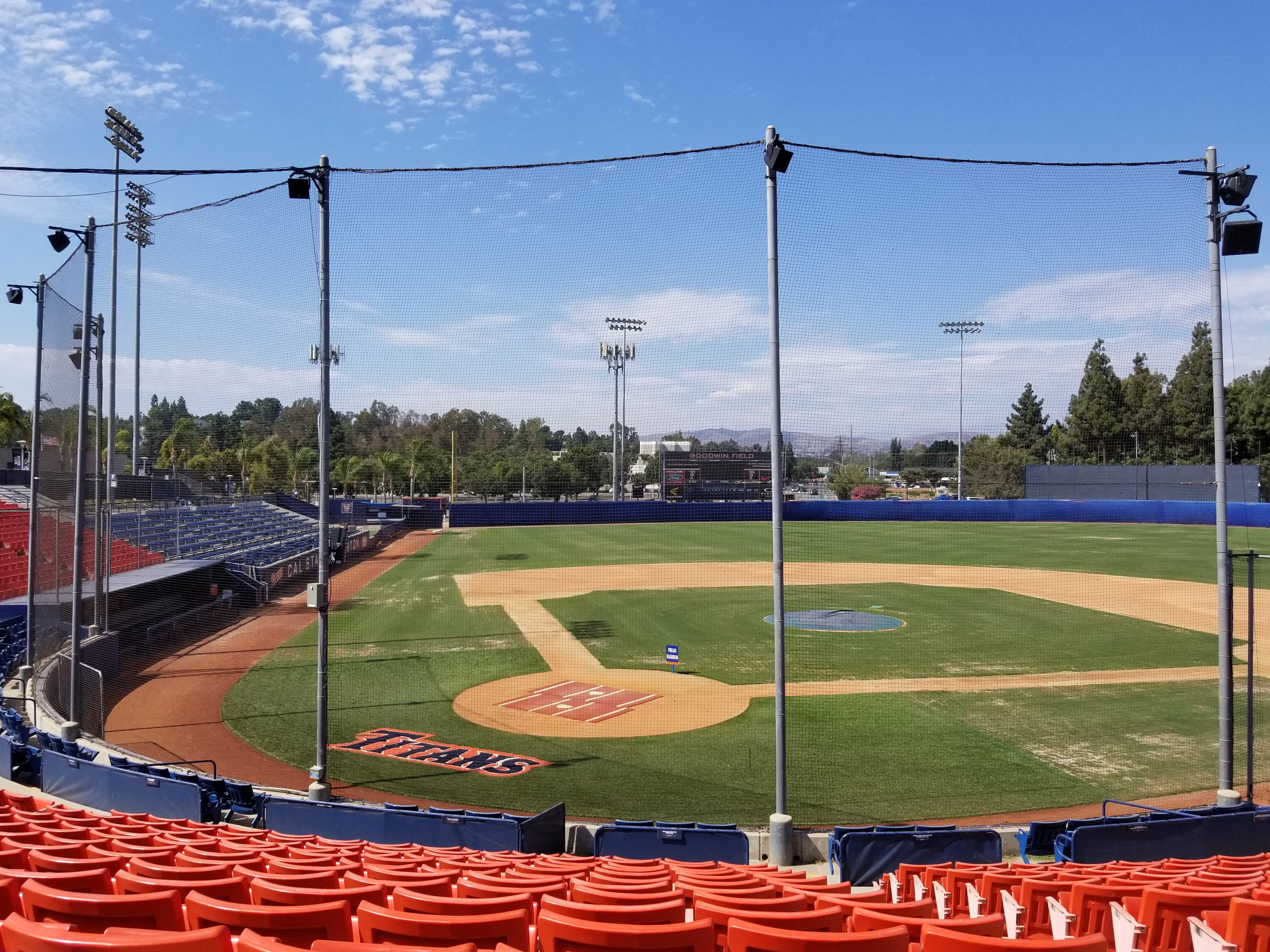
Infield

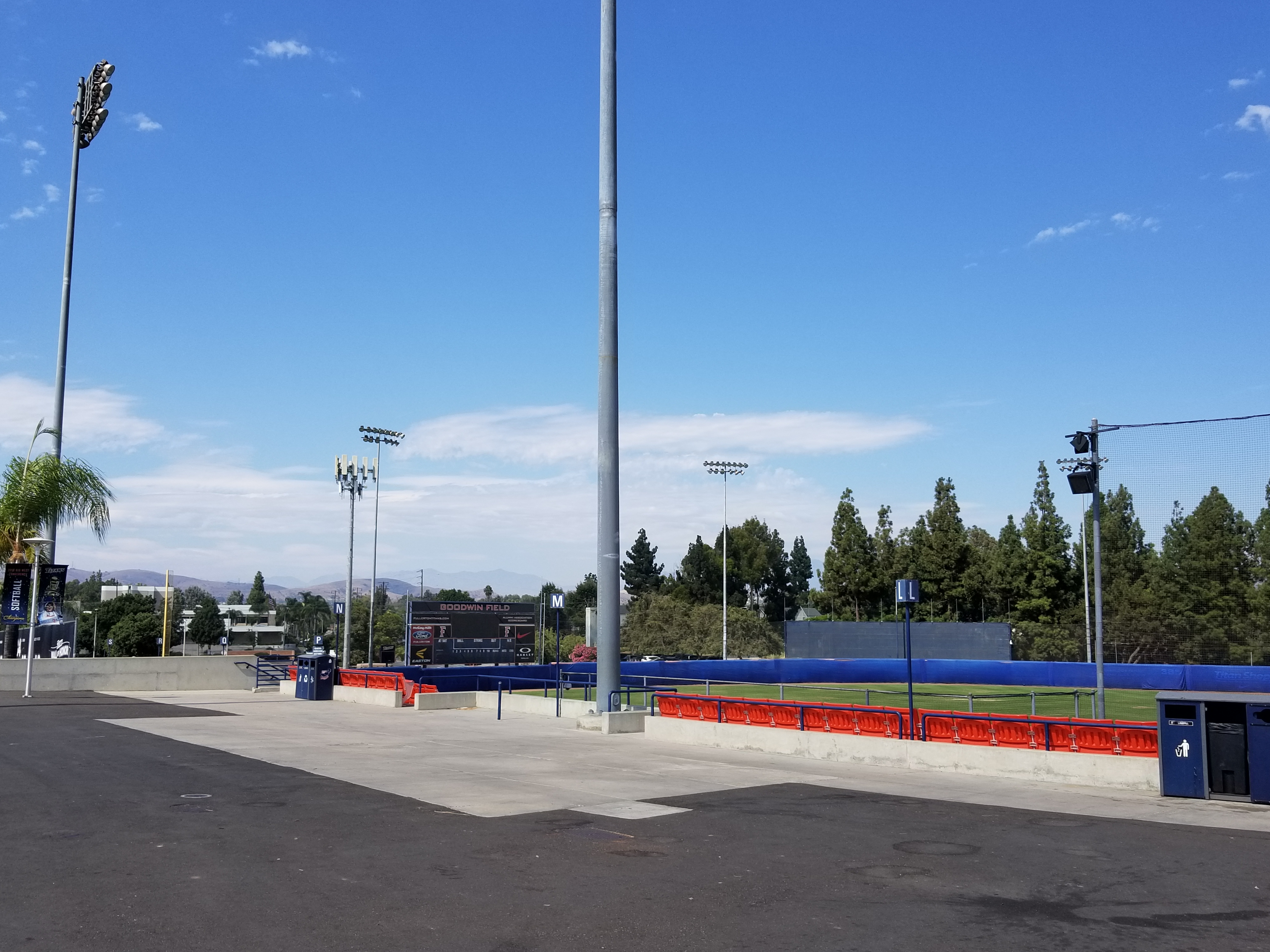
Scoreboard

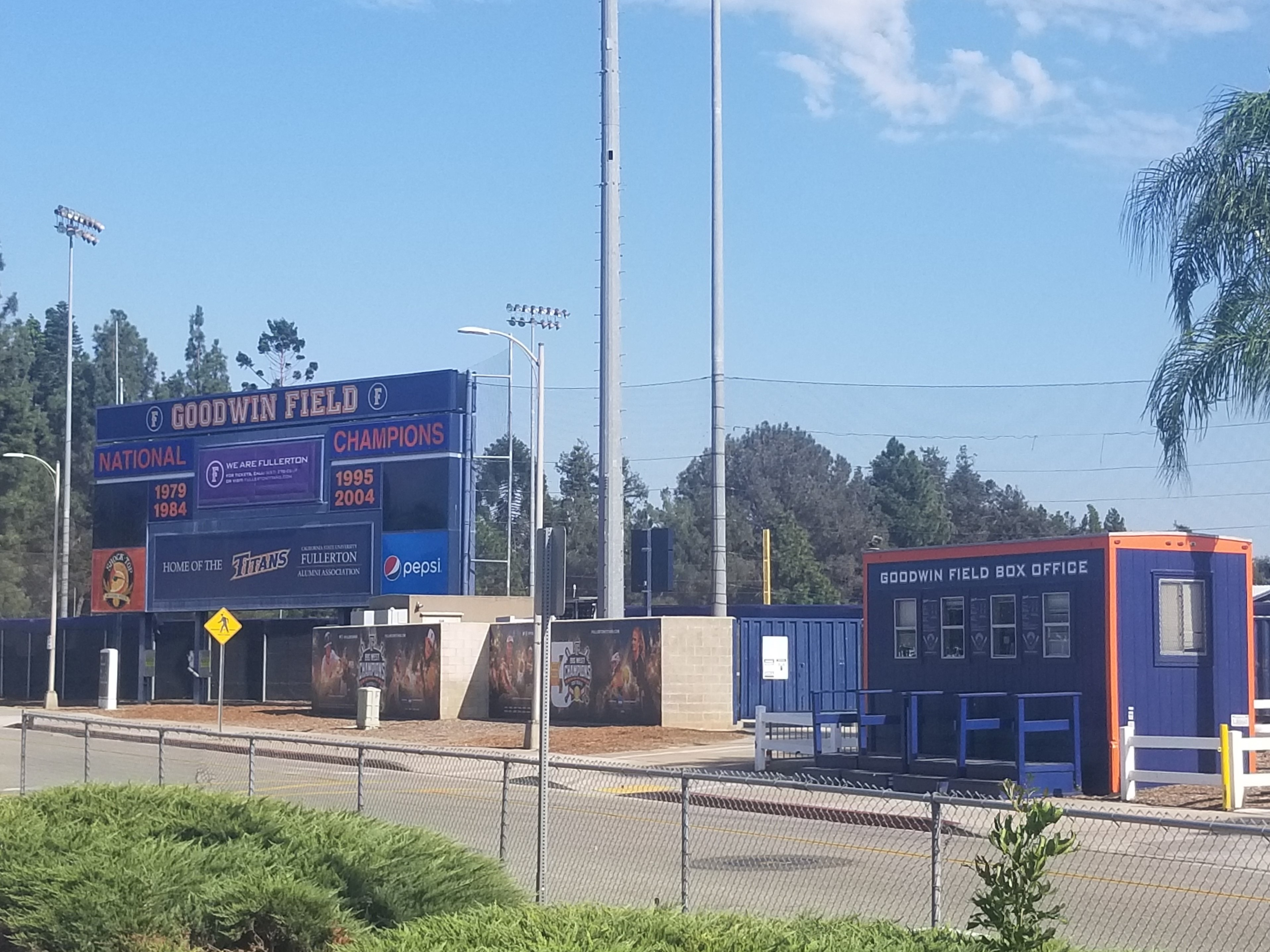
Box office

== See also ==
- List of NCAA Division I baseball venues
