= 2026 UCLA Bruins baseball team =

American college baseball season

2026 UCLA Bruins baseball

Amegy Bank College Baseball Series Champions Big Ten Conference regular season and tournament champions

NCAA Los Angeles Regional, 1–2
- Conference: Big Ten Conference

Ranking
- Coaches: No. 10
- D1Baseball.com: No. 11
- Record: 52–8 (31–2 Big Ten)
- Head coach: John Savage (22nd season)
- Hitting coach: Bryant Ward (12th season)
- Home stadium: Jackie Robinson Stadium

2026 Big Ten Conference baseball standings
	Conf.						Overall
Team	W		L		T	PCT	W		L		T	PCT
No. 11 UCLA ‍†‍‡‍^{y}	28	–	2	–	0	.933	48	–	6	–	0	.889
Nebraska ‍‍‍^{y}	23	–	7	–	0	.767	41	–	14	–	0	.745
No. 13 Oregon ‍‍‍^{y}	20	–	10	–	0	.667	38	–	15	–	0	.717
No. 15 USC ‍‍‍^{y}	20	–	10	–	0	.667	42	–	14	–	0	.750
Purdue ‍‍‍	18	–	13	–	0	.581	36	–	18	–	0	.667
Ohio State ‍‍‍	18	–	12	–	0	.600	29	–	24	–	0	.547
Michigan ‍‍‍	17	–	13	–	0	.567	33	–	22	–	0	.600
Iowa ‍‍‍	15	–	15	–	0	.500	30	–	21	–	0	.588
Illinois ‍‍‍	14	–	16	–	0	.467	27	–	27	–	0	.500
Rutgers ‍‍‍	13	–	17	–	0	.433	26	–	29	–	0	.473
Washington ‍‍‍	12	–	18	–	0	.400	23	–	31	–	0	.426
Michigan State ‍‍‍	12	–	19	–	0	.387	22	–	31	–	0	.415
Minnesota ‍‍‍	11	–	19	–	0	.367	30	–	23	–	0	.566
Maryland ‍‍‍	9	–	21	–	0	.300	27	–	29	–	0	.482
Indiana ‍‍‍	9	–	21	–	0	.300	23	–	31	–	0	.426
Penn State ‍‍‍	9	–	21	–	0	.300	16	–	35	–	0	.314
Northwestern ‍‍‍	8	–	22	–	0	.267	21	–	30	–	1	.413
† – Conference champion ‡ – Tournament champion y – Invited to the NCAA tournament As of May 19, 2026; Rankings from D1Baseball

The 2026 UCLA Bruins baseball team represented the University of California, Los Angeles during the 2026 NCAA Division I baseball season. The Bruins played their home games at Jackie Robinson Stadium as a member of the Big Ten Conference. They were led by head coach John Savage, in his 22nd season at UCLA.

== Previous Season ==
The Bruins ended the 2025 season with a record of 22–8 in conference play and 48–16, good for a First Place tie with Oregon. They played in the Big Ten tournament as the #2 seed in Pool B, beating (11) Illinois, (7) Michigan, and (3) Iowa in the Semifinals, but losing to (8) Nebraska in the championship game. They were invited to play in the NCAA tournament and were the 15th seed in the Los Angeles Super Regional, defeating (4) Fresno State 19–4, (3) Arizona State 11–5, (2) UC Irvine 8–5 in the Regional Final, and UTSA 5–2 in Game 1 and 7–0 in Game 2 in the Super Regionals. They played in the College World Series for the sixth time in program history, defeating Murray State 6–4, before losing to eventual national champions (6) LSU 9–5, and then being eliminated by (3) Arkansas 7–3.

== Personnel ==
=== Roster ===
2026 UCLA Bruins roster
Pitchers: 3 - David Orlinsky - Senior; 10 - Ian May - (redshirt) Senior; 12 - Zach Strickland - Freshman; 14 - Landon Stump - Junior; 16 - Jake Swenson - Junior; 18 - Wylan Moss - Sophomore; 20 - Justin Lee - Junior; 21 - Jack O'Connor - Senior; 24 - Logan Reddemann - Junior; 25 - CJ Bott - Sophomore; 27 - Easton Hawk - Sophomore; 29 - Finn McIlroy - Senior; 31 - Chris Aldrich - Graduate Student (GS); 34 - Mack Edwards - Freshman; 35 - Hayden George - Freshman; 41 - Will Crain - Freshman; 44 - Ian Fisher - Freshman; 45 - Chris Grothues - (redshirt); 47 - Elai Iwanaga - Freshman; 55 - Michael Barnett - Senior; 85 - Cal Randall - Junior; 99 - Angel Cervantes - Freshman	Catchers: 8 - Kasen Khansarinia - Sophomore; 33 - Blake Balsz - Junior; 40 - Chashel Dugger - Junior; Infielders: 1 - Roch Cholowsky - Junior; 2 - Grant Gray - (redshirt) Sophomore; 4 - Phoenix Call - Junior; 6 - Dominic Cadiz - Freshman; 7 - Roman Martin - Junior; 19 - David Mysza - Sophomore; 26 - Aiden Aguayo - Freshman; 28 - Maverek Russell - Freshman; 30 - Tyler Dunning - Freshman; 39 - Mulivai Levu - Junior	Outfielders: 3 - Michael Cunningham - Graduate Student (GS); 5 - Aidan Espinoza - (redshirt) Sophomore; 9 - Will Gasparino - Junior; 11 - Payton Brennan - (redshirt) Junior; 15 - Jarrod Hocking - Senior; 36 - Dean West - Junior; 38 - Trey Gudoy - Freshman

=== Coaches ===
2026 UCLA Bruins baseball coaching staff
- John Savage – head coach – 22nd season
- Bryant Ward – assistant coach – 11th season
- Griffin Barnes – assistant coach – 2nd season
- Jake Palmer – assistant coach – 1st season

Note: Season counter accounts for all stints at UCLA.

== Schedule and results ==
2026 UCLA Bruins baseball game log (Overall:52–8; Conference: 31–2); (Home: 28–7; Away: 18–1; Neutral: 5–0)
Regular season (48–6)
February (8–2)
(Home; 6–2; Away: 0–0; Neutral: 2–0)

Date	Time (PST)	Opponent	Rank	TV	Venue	Score	Win	Loss	Save	Attendance	Overall record	B1G record
February 13	5:00 p.m.	vs UC San Diego*	No. 1	B1G+	Jackie Robinson Stadium • Los Angeles, California	**W** 8–4	**Reddenann** (1–0)	Villar (0–1)	None	1,247	1–0	—
February 14	2:00 p.m.	vs UC San Diego*	No. 1	B1G+	Jackie Robinson Stadium • Los Angeles, California	**W** 7–2	**Barnett** (1–0)	Gregson (0–1)	None	1,191	2–0	—
February 15	1:00 p.m.	vs UC San Diego*	No. 1	B1G+	Jackie Robinson Stadium • Los Angeles, California	**L** 7–8	Etnire (1–0)	**Hawk** (0–1)	Henson (1)	1,102	2–1	—
February 17	5:00 p.m.	vs Tulane*	No. 1	B1G+	Jackie Robinson Stadium • Los Angeles, California	**W** 13–5	**Strickland** (1–0)	Wilcenski (0–1)	None	361	3–1	—
February 20	5:00 p.m.	vs No. 7 TCU*	No. 1	FS1	Jackie Robinson Stadium • Los Angeles, California	**W** 10–2	**Reddeman** (2–0)	Brassfield (0–1)	None	1,165	4–1	—
February 21	2:00 p.m.	vs No. 7 TCU*	No. 1	B1G+	Jackie Robinson Stadium • Los Angeles, California	**W** 5–1	**Barnett** (2–0)	Davis (0–2)	**Moss** (1)	1,413	5–1	—
February 22	1:00 p.m.	vs No. 7 TCU*	No. 1	B1G+	Jackie Robinson Stadium • Los Angeles, California	**W** 15–5^{8}	**Iwanaga** (1–0)	Sagouspe (0–1)	None	1,552	6–1	—
February 24	5:00 p.m.	vs San Diego State*	No. 1	B1G+	Jackie Robinson Stadium • Los Angeles, California	**L** 3–4	Belardes (1–1)	**Strickland** (1–1)	Russell (2)	479	6–2	—
February 27	1:00 p.m.	No. 20 Tennessee; Amegy Bank College Baseball Series	No. 1	FloSports	Globe Life Field • Arlington, Texas	**W** 12–5	**Reddemann** (3–0)	Kuhns (1–1)	None	—	7–2	—
February 28	5:00 p.m.	No. 23 Texas A&M; Amegy Bank College Baseball Series	No. 1	FloSports	Globe Life Field • Arlington, Texas	**W** 11–1^{7}	**Barnett** (3–0)	Moss (1–1)	None	13,097	8–2	—

March (18–0)
(Home; 9–0; Away: 8–0; Neutral: 1–0)

Date	Time	Opponent	Rank	TV	Venue	Score	Win	Loss	Save	Attendance	Overall record	B1G record
March 1	12:30 p.m.	No. 4 Mississippi State; Amegy Bank College Baseball Series	No. 1	FloSports	Globe Life Field • Arlington, Texas	**W** 8–7^{10}	**Hawk** (1–1)	Davis (0–1)	None	8,903	9–2	—
March 3	5:00 p.m.	vs Cal State Fullerton	No. 1	B1G+	Jackie Robinson Stadium • Los Angeles, California	**W** 4–3^{10}	**Randall** (1–0)	Wright (0–1)	None	598	10–2	—
March 6	1:00 p.m.	at Ohio State	No. 1	B1G+	Bill Davis Stadium • Columbus, Ohio	**W** 11–1	**Reddemann** (4–0)	Kuzniewski (0–1)	None	913	11–2	1–0
March 7	11:00 a.m.	at Ohio State	No. 1	B1G+	Bill Davis Stadium • Columbus, Ohio	**W** 19–6^{8}	**Moss** (1–0)	Domke (1–3)	None	2,096	12–2	2–0
March 8	8:00 a.m.	at Ohio State	No. 1	B1G+	Bill Davis Stadium • Columbus, Ohio	**W** 10–7	**Hawk** (2–1)	Graf (0–1)	None	1,277	13–2	3–0
March 10	6:00 p.m.	vs UC Irvine	No. 1	B1G+	Jackie Robinson Stadium • Los Angeles, California	**W** 11–1^{7}	**Cervantes** (1–0)	Castles (0–3)	None	544	14–2	—
March 13	6:00 p.m.	vs Michigan	No. 1	B1G+	Jackie Robinson Stadium • Los Angeles, California	**W** 10–5	**Reddemann** (5–0)	Montgomery (2–1)	None	1,073	15–2	4–0
March 14	2:00 p.m.	vs Michigan	No. 1	B1G+	Jackie Robinson Stadium • Los Angeles, California	**W** 2–0	**Barnett** (4–0)	K. Barr (2–2)	**Hawk** (1)	1,187	16–2	5–0
March 15	1:00 p.m.	vs Michigan	No. 1	B1G+	Jackie Robinson Stadium • Los Angeles, California	**W** 7–2	**Stump** (1–0)	Brinham (1–2)	None	1,410	17–2	6–0
March 17	6:00 p.m.	vs Pepperdine	No. 1	B1G+	Jackie Robinson Stadium • Los Angeles, California	**W** 5–4	**Strickland** (2–1)	Plisinski (0–1)	**Randall** (1)	514	18–2	—
March 20	6:00 p.m.	vs Maryland	No. 1	B1G+	Jackie Robinson Stadium • Los Angeles, California	**W** 12–2^{7}	**Reddemann** (6–0)	Williams (1–2)	None	604	19–2	7–0
March 21	2:00 p.m.	vs Maryland	No. 1	B1G+	Jackie Robinson Stadium • Los Angeles, California	**W** 8–3	**Moss** (2–0)	Smith (0–2)	**Hawk** (2)	614	20–2	8–0
March 22	1:00 p.m.	vs Maryland	No. 1	B1G+	Jackie Robinson Stadium • Los Angeles, California	**W** 14–4^{8}	**Lee** (1–0)	Yeager (0–1)	None	791	21–2	9–0
March 24	6:00 p.m.	vs Loyola Marymount	No. 1	B1G+	Jackie Robinson Stadium • Los Angeles, California	**W** 6–2	**Lee** (2–0)	Geis (0–4)	None	582	22–2	—
March 27	11:00 a.m.	at Iowa	No. 1	B1G+	Duane Banks Field • Iowa City, Iowa	**W** 5–2	**Reddemann** (7–0)	Bleeker (3–3)	**Hawk** (3)	1,136	23–2	10–0
March 28	10:00 a.m.	at Iowa	No. 1	B1G+	Duane Banks Field • Iowa City, Iowa	**W** 19–0^{7}	**Barnett** (5–0)	Runde (1–2)	None	1,506	24–2	11–0
March 29	10:05 a.m.	at Iowa	No. 1	B1G+	Duane Banks Field • Iowa City, Iowa	**W** 14–6	**Moss** (3–0)	Alivo (1–2)	None	1,442	25–2	12–0
March 31	6:00 p.m.	at UC Irvine	No. 1	ESPN+	Cicerone Field at Anteater Ballpark • Irvine, California	**W** 9–1	**Cervantes** (2–0)	Grant (0–1)	None	2,685	26–2	—

April (14–2)
(Home; 10–2; Away: 4–0)

Date	Time	Opponent	Rank	TV	Venue	Score	Win	Loss	Save	Attendance	Overall record	B1G record
April 3	6:00 p.m.	No. 12 USC; Rivalry	No. 1	B1G+	Jackie Robinson Stadium • Los Angeles, California	**W** 12–4	**Strickland** (3–1)	Lauridsen (2–1)	**Hawk** (4)	1,747	27–2	13–0
April 4	2:00 p.m.	No. 12 USC; Rivalry	No. 1	B1G+	Jackie Robinson Stadium • Los Angeles, California	**W** 9–8	**Randall** (2–0)	Troy (1–2)	**Hawk** (5)	1,672	28–2	14–0
April 5	3:00 p.m.	No. 12 USC; Rivalry	No. 1	BTN	Jackie Robinson Stadium • Los Angeles, California	**W** 10–4	**Grothues** (1–0)	Johnson (2–1)	**Strickland** (1)	1,569	29–2	15–0
April 7	6:00 p.m.	@ Cal State Fullerton	No. 1	ESPN+	Goodwin Field • Fullerton, California	**W** 7–3	**Swenson** (1–0)	Martin (0–2)	None	3,311	30–2	—
April 10	3:00 p.m.	@ Rutgers	No. 1	B1G+	Bainton Field • Piscataway, New Jersey	**W** 4–1^{14}	**Strickland** (4–1)	Gleason (1–1)	**Hawk** (6)	1,224	31–2	16–0
April 11	12:00 p.m.	@ Rutgers	No. 1	B1G+	Bainton Field • Piscataway, New Jersey	**W** 7–1	**Barnett** (6–0)	Borghese (1–3)	None	1,308	32–2	17–0
April 12	9:00 a.m.	@ Rutgers	No. 1	B1G+	Bainton Field • Piscataway, New Jersey	**W** 9–2	**Stump** (2–0)	Harrison (2–3)	None	1,214	33–2	18–0
April 14	7:00 p.m.	UC Santa Barbara	No. 1	BTN	Jackie Robinson Stadium • Los Angeles, California	**L** 0–4	Krodel (3–2)	**Cervantes (2–1)**	Tryba (2)	880	33–3	—
April 17	6:00 p.m.	Minnesota	No. 1	BTN	Jackie Robinson Stadium • Los Angeles, California	**W** 4–2	**Reddemann** (8–0)	Selvig (4–3)	**Hawk** (7)	869	34–3	19–0
April 18	2:00 p.m.	Minnesota	No. 1	B1G+	Jackie Robinson Stadium • Los Angeles, California	**W** 6–4	**Moss** (4–0)	Hemmesch (1–2)	**Hawk** (8)	1,224	35–3	20–0
April 19	12:00 p.m.	Minnesota	No. 1	B1G+	Jackie Robinson Stadium • Los Angeles, California	**W** 5–2	**O'Connor** (1–0)	Kruzan (3–3)	**Hawk** (9)	1,278	36–3	21–0
April 21	6:00 p.m.	Hawaii	No. 1	B1G+	Jackie Robinson Stadium • Los Angeles, California	**W** 12–7	**May** (1–0)	Martin-Grudzielanek (0–4)	None	669	37–3	—
April 24	6:00 p.m.	Sacramento State	No. 1	B1G+	Jackie Robinson Stadium • Los Angeles, California	**W** 6–5	**Lee** (3–0)	Rogalski (0–1)	None	927	38–3	—
April 25	6:00 p.m.	Sacramento State	No. 1	B1G+	Jackie Robinson Stadium • Los Angeles, California	**W** 5–3	**Hawk** (3–1)	Hunter (0–1)	None	895	39–3	—
April 26	1:00 p.m.	Sacramento State	No. 1	B1G+	Jackie Robinson Stadium • Los Angeles, California	**L** 6–9	Timothy (3–4)	**Stump** (2–1)	Wilson (4)	1,232	39–4	—
April 28	4:35 p.m.	@ UC Santa Barbara	No. 1	ESPN+	Caesar Uyesaka Stadium • Santa Barbara, California	**W** 15–3^{7}	**Cervantes** (3–1)	Froling (1–2)	None	1,366	40–4	—

May (8–2)
(Home; 2–1; Away: 6–1)

Date	Time	Opponent	Rank	TV	Venue	Score	Win	Loss	Save	Attendance	Overall record	B1G record
May 1	3:05 p.m.	@ Michigan State	No. 1	B1G+	Jeff Ishbia Field at McLane Stadium • East Lansing, Michigan	**W** 4–1	**Swenson** (2–0)	Higgins (3–2)	**Hawk** (10)	622	41–4	22–0
May 2	12:35 p.m.	@ Michigan State	No. 1	B1G+	Jeff Ishbia Field at McLane Stadium • East Lansing, Michigan	**W** 4–3	**Iwanaga** (2–0)	Donovan (4–3)	**Hawk** (11)	721	42–4	23–0
May 3	9:05 a.m.	@ Michigan State	No. 1	B1G+	Jeff Ishbia Field at McLane Stadium • East Lansing, Michigan	**W** 13–11	**Strickland** (5–1)	Higgins (3–3)	**Hawk** (12)	711	43–4	24–0
May 5	6:00 p.m.	@ LMU	No. 1	ESPN+	George C. Page Stadium • Los Angeles, California	**W** 8–4	**Cervantes** (4–1)	Schneider (0–2)	None	1,245	44–4	—
May 8	6:00 p.m.	No. 13 Oregon	No. 1	B1G+	Jackie Robinson Stadium • Los Angeles, California	**W** 11–1^{7}	**Moss** (5–0)	Sanford (6–2)	None	1,545	45–4	25–0
May 9	2:00 p.m.	No. 13 Oregon	No. 1	B1G+	Jackie Robinson Stadium • Los Angeles, California	**L** 6–9	Bradley (5–0)	**Hawk** (3–2)	None	1,362	45–5	25–1
May 10	12:00 p.m.	No. 13 Oregon	No. 1	B1G+	Jackie Robinson Stadium • Los Angeles, California	**W** 9–6	**Strickland** (6–1)	Bell (2–5)	**Hawk** (13)	1,290	46–5	26–1
May 14	6:05 p.m.	@ Washington	No. 1	B1G+	Husky Ballpark • Seattle, Washington	**L** 0–8	Thomas (2–4)	**Moss** (5–1)	Nichols (1)	1,318	46–6	26–2
May 15	6:05 p.m.	@ Washington	No. 1	B1G+	Husky Ballpark • Seattle, Washington	**W** 6–5	**Randall** (3–0)	Johnson (0–4)	**Hawk** (14)	1,761	47–6	27–2
May 16	1:05 p.m.	@ Washington	No. 1	B1G+	Husky Ballpark • Seattle, Washington	**W** 6–1	**May** (2–0)	Gore (1–2)	None	1,479	48–6	28–2

Postseason (4–2)
Big Ten Tournament (3–0)

Date	Time	Opponent	Rank	TV	Venue	Score	Win	Loss	Save	Attendance	Overall record	Tournament record
May 22	7:00 p.m.	vs. (5) Purdue (Quarterfinals)	(1); No. 1	BTN	Charles Schwab Field • Omaha, Nebraska	**W** 4–3	**Hawk** (4–2)	Kramer (4–4)	None		49–6	1–0
May 23	2:00 p.m.	vs. (4) No. 25 USC (Semifinals)	(1); No. 1	BTN	Charles Schwab Field • Omaha, Nebraska	**W** 7–5	**Hawk** (5–2)	Troy (1–3)	None		50–6	2–0
May 24	2:00 p.m.	vs. (3) No. 14 Oregon (Championship)	(1); No. 1	BTN	Charles Schwab Field • Omaha, Nebraska	**W** 3–2 (11)	**Hawk** (6–2)	Bell (2–6)	None		51–6	3–0

NCAA Los Angeles Regional (1–2)

Date	Time	Opponent	Rank	TV	Venue	Score	Win	Loss	Save	Attendance	Overall record	NCAAT record
May 29	12:00 p.m.	vs. Saint Mary's	(1); No. 1	ESPN2	Jackie Robinson Stadium • Los Angeles, California	**L** 2–3	Staton (4–3)	**Hawk** (6–3)	None	1,898	51–7	0–1
May 30	1:00 p.m.	vs. Virginia Tech	(1); No. 1	ESPNU	Jackie Robinson Stadium • Los Angeles, California	**W** 6–5	**Hawk** (7–3)	Grim (4–5)	None	1,680	52–7	1–1
May 31	1:00 p.m.	vs. Saint Mary's	(1); No. 1	ESPNU	Jackie Robinson Stadium • Los Angeles, California	**L** 5–6 (10)	Roberts (2–1)	**Hawk** (7–4)	None	1,680	52–8	1–2

"#" represents ranking. All rankings from D1 Baseball Poll on the date of the contest.
"()" represents postseason seeding in the Big 10 Tournament or NCAA Regional, respectively.
= Win, = Loss, = Canceled/Postponed
Bold = **UCLA Bruins team member**
* = Non-Conference Game
Schedule Source:

== Rankings ==
Ranking movements Legend: ██ Increase in ranking ██ Decrease in ranking ( ) = First-place votes
	Week																	
Poll	Pre	1	2	3	4	5	6	7	8	9	10	11	12	13	14	15	16	Final
Coaches'	2 (14)	2 (14)*	2 (15)	1 (21)	1 (22)	1 (26)	1 (29)	1 (30)	1 (30)	1 (30)	1 (30)	1 (29)	1 (30)	1 (30)	1 (28)	1 (26)	1 (26)*	10
Baseball America	1	1	1	1	1	1	1	1	1	1	1	1	1	1	1	1*	1*	14
NCBWA†	2	3	2	1	1	1	1	1	1	1	1	1	1	1	1	1*	12	15
D1Baseball	1	1	1	1	1	1	1	1	1	1	1	1	1	1	1	1	1*	11
Perfect Game	5	5	3	1	1	1	1	1	1	1	1	1	1	1	1	1*	1*	17

† NCBWA ranks 30 teams in their preseason poll, but only ranks 25 teams weekly during the season.
* A new poll was not released for this week, so for comparison purposes, the previous week's ranking is inserted in this week's slot.

== 2026 MLB draft ==
10 Bruins were selected in the 2026 Major League Baseball draft.

Player	Position	Round	Overall	MLB Team
Roch Cholowsky	SS	1	1	Chicago White Sox
Logan Reddemann	RHP	2	38	Colorado Rockies
Mulivai Levu	1B	CB-B	70	Cincinnati Reds
Roman Martin	3B	4	128	Oakland Athletics
Cal Randall	RHP	5	146	St. Louis Cardinals
Will Gasparino	OF	5	161	Philadelphia Phillies
Dean West	OF	7	222	Toronto Blue Jays
Cashel Dugger	C	9	256	Washington Nationals
Michael Barnett	RHP	20	587	Minnesota Twins
Justin Lee	RHP	20	609	Philadelphia Phillies
