= 2026 UC Santa Barbara Gauchos baseball team =

American college baseball season

2026 UC Santa Barbara Gauchos baseball

Big West regular season co-champions

Austin Regional, 2–2
- Conference: Big West Conference
- Record: 40–20 (22–8 Big West)
- Head coach: Andrew Checketts (15th season)
- Associate head coach: Matt Fonteno (7th season)
- Assistant coach: Kyle Hunt (2nd season)
- Pitching coach: Dylan Jones (7th season)
- Home stadium: Caesar Uyesaka Stadium

2026 Big West Conference baseball standings
	Conf.				Overall
Team	W		L	PCT	W		L	PCT
UC Santa Barbara ‍†‍‍^{y}	22	–	8	.733	40	–	20	.667
Cal Poly ‍‍‡‍^{y}	22	–	8	.733	39	–	24	.619
UC San Diego ‍‍‍	18	–	12	.600	27	–	28	.491
Hawai'i ‍‍‍	16	–	14	.533	27	–	23	.540
Cal State Fullerton ‍‍‍	15	–	15	.500	24	–	32	.429
UC Irvine ‍‍‍	14	–	16	.467	25	–	27	.481
UC Davis ‍‍‍	14	–	16	.467	26	–	28	.481
Cal State Northridge ‍‍‍	12	–	18	.400	25	–	28	.472
Cal State Bakersfield ‍‍‍	11	–	19	.367	21	–	32	.396
Long Beach State ‍‍‍	11	–	19	.367	17	–	35	.327
UC Riverside ‍‍‍	10	–	20	.333	15	–	37	.288
† – Conference champion ‡ – Tournament champion y – Invited to the NCAA tournament As of June 6, 2026; Rankings from D1Baseball

The 2026 UC Santa Barbara Gauchos baseball team is the team that represent the University of California, Santa Barbara during the 2026 NCAA Division I baseball season. The Gauchos play their home games at Caesar Uyesaka Stadium and are members of the Big West Conference. They are led by head coach Andrew Checketts in his fifteenth season as manager. The top five teams in the Big West Conference will play in the conference's postseason tournament, with the winner receiving the automatic bid to the 2026 NCAA tournament. UC Santa Barbara made the conference tournament, but went 1–2. However, they received an at-large bid to the NCAA tournament, and will play in the Austin Regional against Tarleton State in the opening round. The Gauchos ended up losing that game 5–11, and were relegated to the elimination bracket. There, they faced Holy Cross. In their 15–1 win, Jackson Flora officially broke the UCSB single season strikeout record. In their second elimination game, they faced Tarleton State once again, winning 9–5. They then played Texas in their third straight elimination game. In it, they lost 4–6, officially ending their season.

== Previous Season ==
Last season, UC Santa Barbara finished with a 36–18 record, going 16–14 in the Big West, and finishing tied for fourth in the conference. They fell in the first round in an elimination game against Hawai'i, falling 2–6. They did not receive an at-large bid to the 2025 NCAA Division I Baseball Tournament, and finished the season unranked.

== Preseason ==
=== Big West Preseason Poll & Team ===
The Big West Coaches' Poll and Team was released on February 6, 2026. UC Santa Barbara was predicted to finish first in the conference, and also had one player make the preseason team.

Coaches' Poll
Pos.	Team	Points
1	UC Santa Barbara	95 (5)
2	Cal Poly	89 (5)
3	UC Irvine	86 (1)
T-4	Cal State Fullerton	67
T-4	Hawai'i	67
6	UC San Diego	60
7	Long Beach State	41
8	UC Davis	40
9	CSUN	25
10	Cal State Bakersfield	22
11	UC Riverside	13

Preseason Coaches' Team
Player	No.	Position	Class
Jackson Flora	2	RHP	Junior

== Personnel ==
=== Starters ===
Lineup
Pos.	No.	Player.	Year
C	12	Nate Vargas	Senior
1B	6	Nick Husovsky	Graduate
2B	25	Cade Goldstein	Freshman
3B	31	Xavier Esquer	RS Junior
SS	5	Jonathan Mendez	Junior
LF	35	Max Stagg	RS Sophomore
CF	3	Rowan Kelly	Sophomore
RF	41	Noah Karliner	Graduate
DH	19	Cole Kosciusko	Freshman

Weekend pitching rotation
Day	No.	Player.	Year
Friday	2	Jackson Flora	Junior
Saturday	20	Nathan Aceves	Sophomore
Sunday	17	Kellan Montgomery	Senior

=== Roster ===
2026 UC Santa Barbara Gauchos baseball team
Players
Coaches

#	Pos.	Name	B/T	Height	Weight	Year	Home town
1	OF	Colin Beazizo	L/L	6 ft 0 in (1.83 m)	205 lb (93 kg)	Jr	Lake Stevens, WA
2	RHP	Jackson Flora	R/R	6 ft 5 in (1.96 m)	205 lb (93 kg)	Jr	Pleasanton, CA
3	OF	Rowan Kelly	L/L	5 ft 10 in (1.78 m)	175 lb (79 kg)	So	Menlo Park, CA
5	INF	Jonathan Mendez	R/R	6 ft 1 in (1.85 m)	205 lb (93 kg)	Jr	Los Angeles, CA
6	INF	Nick Husovsky	R/R	6 ft 1 in (1.85 m)	190 lb (86 kg)	Gr	Ramona, CA
7	LHP	Cole Tryba	L/L	6 ft 0 in (1.83 m)	185 lb (84 kg)	Jr	Long Beach, CA
9	OF	Jack Haferkamp	R/R	6 ft 4 in (1.93 m)	205 lb (93 kg)	RS Fr	Carlsbad, CA
10	OF	Liam Barrett	L/R	6 ft 0 in (1.83 m)	185 lb (84 kg)	So	Mountain View, CA
12	C	Nate Vargas	L/R	6 ft 3 in (1.91 m)	225 lb (102 kg)	Sr	Rocklin, CA
13	C	Nico Libed	R/R	5 ft 8 in (1.73 m)	180 lb (82 kg)	Jr	Chula Vista, CA
14	RHP	Hudson Aber	R/R	6 ft 2 in (1.88 m)	195 lb (88 kg)	RS Fr	Danville, CA
15	LHP	Nic Peterson	L/L	6 ft 3 in (1.91 m)	200 lb (91 kg)	Jr	Tustin, CA
16	INF	Corey Nunez	R/R	6 ft 3 in (1.91 m)	195 lb (88 kg)	Sr	Torrance, CA
17	RHP	Kellan Montgomery	R/R	6 ft 0 in (1.83 m)	210 lb (95 kg)	Sr	Santa Barbara, CA
19	UTL	Cole Kosciusko	L/L	6 ft 2 in (1.88 m)	205 lb (93 kg)	Sr	Castro Valley, CA
20	RHP	Nathan Aceves	R/R	6 ft 3 in (1.91 m)	220 lb (100 kg)	So	Huntington Beach, CA
21	LHP	Peter Broughton	L/L	6 ft 1 in (1.85 m)	160 lb (73 kg)	Fr	Torrance, CA
22	LHP	Chase Hoover	L/L	6 ft 1 in (1.85 m)	205 lb (93 kg)	Jr	Santa Barbara, CA
23	C	Braden Watson	R/R	6 ft 3 in (1.91 m)	230 lb (104 kg)	RS Fr	Peoria, AZ
24	LHP	Van Froling	L/L	6 ft 4 in (1.93 m)	210 lb (95 kg)	So	Sacramento, CA
25	UTL	Cade Goldstein	L/R	6 ft 0 in (1.83 m)	185 lb (84 kg)	Fr	Calabasas, CA
26	INF	William Vasseur	R/R	6 ft 4 in (1.93 m)	220 lb (100 kg)	Sr	Fort Collins, CO
27	RHP	Josh Jannicelli	R/R	6 ft 5 in (1.96 m)	200 lb (91 kg)	Fr	Santa Rosa, CA
28	RHP	Raymond Olivas	R/R	6 ft 1 in (1.85 m)	185 lb (84 kg)	So	Stockton, CA
29	RHP	Gavin Moran	R/R	6 ft 2 in (1.88 m)	190 lb (86 kg)	Fr	La Puente, CA
31	INF	Xavier Esquer	R/R	5 ft 10 in (1.78 m)	190 lb (86 kg)	RS Jr	Palo Alto, CA
32	RHP	Calvin Proskey	R/R	6 ft 3 in (1.91 m)	195 lb (88 kg)	Jr	Oak Park, IL
33	RHP	Luke Bailey	R/R	6 ft 2 in (1.88 m)	175 lb (79 kg)	Fr	San Diego, CA
34	RHP	Stunner Gonzales	R/R	6 ft 7 in (2.01 m)	225 lb (102 kg)	So	Carlsbad, CA
35	OF	Max Stagg	R/R	6 ft 2 in (1.88 m)	215 lb (98 kg)	RS So	Adelaide, Australia
36	RHP	Kole Laubach	R/R	6 ft 2 in (1.88 m)	195 lb (88 kg)	Fr	San Jose, CA
37	C	Ian Fernandez	R/R	6 ft 2 in (1.88 m)	205 lb (93 kg)	So	Napa, CA
38	INF	Dawson Dines	L/R	6 ft 5 in (1.96 m)	215 lb (98 kg)	So	Ripon, CA
39	OF	Mitch Namie	L/R	6 ft 2 in (1.88 m)	205 lb (93 kg)	Sr	Mesa, AZ
41	OF	Noah Karliner	R/R	6 ft 4 in (1.93 m)	235 lb (107 kg)	Gr	Huntington Beach, CA
44	RHP	Kyle Pott	R/R	6 ft 6 in (1.98 m)	200 lb (91 kg)	Fr	Elk Grove, CA
45	RHP	AJ Krodel	R/R	6 ft 4 in (1.93 m)	200 lb (91 kg)	Jr	Villa Park, CA
46	INF	Ryan Severns	R/R	6 ft 2 in (1.88 m)	180 lb (82 kg)	Fr	Fontana, CA
49	INF	Jake Johnson	R/R	6 ft 1 in (1.85 m)	190 lb (86 kg)	Fr	San Diego, CA
50	INF	Jordan Marian	S/R	6 ft 0 in (1.83 m)	195 lb (88 kg)	Fr	Foothill Ranch, CA
51	RHP	Tyler Walton	R/R	6 ft 4 in (1.93 m)	175 lb (79 kg)	Fr	Mission Hills, CA
53	INF	Evan Thomas	L/R	6 ft 4 in (1.93 m)	195 lb (88 kg)	Fr	Fallbrook, CA
55	LHP	Donovann Jackson	L/L	6 ft 3 in (1.91 m)	200 lb (91 kg)	Sr	Glendora, CA

Head coach

Andrew Checketts

Assistant coach(es)

Matt Fonteno
Dylan Jones
Kyle Hunt

Legend

- (C) Team captain
- (S) Suspended
- (I) Ineligible
- Injured
- Current redshirt

Roster
Last update: February 19, 2026

== Schedule ==
Legend
	Gauchos win
	Gauchos loss
	Postponement
**Bold**	Gauchos team member

2026 UC Santa Barbara Gauchos baseball game log (40–20)
Regular season (37–16)

February (7–2)
Date	Time (PST)	TV	Opponent	Rank	Stadium	Score	Win	Loss	Save	Attendance	Overall	BWC
February 13	2:00 p.m.	ESPN+	at No. 20 Southern Miss*	—	Pete Taylor Park; Hattiesburg, Mississippi	5–1	**Flora (1–0)**	Allen (0–1)	**Hoover (1)**	5,498	1–0	—
February 14	10:00 a.m.	ESPN+	at No. 20 Southern Miss*	—	Pete Taylor Park	6–8	Och (1–0)	**Krodel (0–1)**	Clark (1)	5,561	1–1	—
February 15	1:00 p.m.	ESPN+	at No. 20 Southern Miss*	—	Pete Taylor Park	5–6	Clark (1–0)	**Jannicelli (0–1)**	None	5,459	1–2	—
February 17	1:30 p.m.	ESPN+	at Pepperdine*	—	Eddy D. Field Stadium; Malibu, California	**Canceled due to inclement weather**						
February 20	4:05 p.m.	ESPN+	Portland*	—	Caesar Uyesaka Stadium; Santa Barbara, California	4–1	**Flora (2–0)**	Newmann (0–1)	**Hoover (2)**	735	2–2	—
February 21	3:05 p.m.	ESPN+	Portland*	—	Caesar Uyesaka Stadium	3–2	**Aceves (1–0)**	Anderson (0–1)	**Olivas (1)**	901	3–2	—
February 22	12:05 p.m.	ESPN+	Portland*	—	Caesar Uyesaka Stadium	6–2	**Montgomery (1–0)**	Via (0–2)	**Krodel (1)**	636	4–2	—
February 24	6:00 p.m.	ESPN+	at LMU*	—	George C. Page Stadium; Los Angeles, California	5–3 (11)	**Krodel (1–1)**	Champion (0–1)	None	267	5–2	—
February 27	4:05 p.m.	ESPN+	Utah*	—	Caesar Uyesaka Stadium	7–2	**Flora (3–0)**	McAnelly (1–2)	None	631	6–2	—
February 28	3:05 p.m.	ESPN+	Utah*	—	Caesar Uyesaka Stadium	7–1	**Aceves (2–0)**	Riske (1–1)	None	594	7–2	—

March (9–8)
Date	Time (PST)	TV	Opponent	Rank	Stadium	Score	Win	Loss	Save	Attendance	Overall	BWC
March 1	1:05 p.m.	ESPN+	Utah*	—	Caesar Uyesaka Stadium; Santa Barbara, California	12–1	**Montgomery (2–0)**	Abercromb (0–1)	None	715	8–2	—
March 3	6:00 p.m.	ESPN+	LMU*	—	Caesar Uyesaka Stadium	11–1 (8)	**Donovann (1–0)**	Johnson (0–1)	**Olivas (2)**	477	9–2	—
March 6	4:05 p.m.	ESPN+	Long Beach State	—	Caesar Uyesaka Stadium	4–3	**Flora (4–0)**	Fields (1–2)	**Krodel (2)**	685	10–2	1–0
March 7	3:05 p.m.	ESPN+	Long Beach State	—	Caesar Uyesaka Stadium	7–4	**Olivas (1–0)**	Anderson (0–2)	None	882	11–2	2–0
March 8	1:05 p.m.	ESPN+	Long Beach State	—	Caesar Uyesaka Stadium	6–2	**Montgomery (3–0)**	Shelby (1–1)	**Krodel (3)**	607	12–2	3–0
March 10	4:35 p.m.	ESPN+	Saint Mary's*	—	Caesar Uyesaka Stadium	13–3 (7)	**Froling (1–0)**	Nobles (0–1)	None	465	13–2	—
March 13	6:00 p.m.	ESPN+	at UC Davis	—	Dobbins Stadium; Davis, California	4–0	**Flora (5–0)**	Valdez (1–2)	None	542	14–2	4–0
March 14	6:00 p.m.	ESPN+	at UC Davis	—	Dobbins Stadium	4–5	Barnes (1–0)	**Krodel (1–2)**	None	535	14–3	4–1
March 15	1:00 p.m.	ESPN+	at UC Davis	—	Dobbins Stadium	6–10	Barnes II (1–0)	**Montgomery (3–1)**	None	470	14–4	4–2
March 20	4:35 p.m.	ESPN+	Hawai'i	—	Caesar Uyesaka Stadium	1–2	Magdaleno (3–1)	**Tryba (0–1)**	Alkire II (3)	486	14–5	4–3
March 21	3:05 p.m.	ESPN+	Hawai'i	—	Caesar Uyesaka Stadium	1–3	Robello (4–1)	**Aceves (2–1)**	Alkire II (4)	696	14–6	4–4
March 22	1:05 p.m.	ESPN+	Hawai'i	—	Caesar Uyesaka Stadium	5–1	**Montgomery (4–1)**	O'Brien (1–3)	**Froling (1)**	684	15–6	5–4
March 24	4:00 p.m.	ESPN+	at Saint Mary's*	—	Louis Guisto Field; Moraga, California	4–10	Sarantos (1–1)	**Tryba** (0–2)	None	205	15–7	—
March 27	4:35 p.m.	ESPN+	No. 20 Oregon*	—	Caesar Uyesaka Stadium	0–4	Morgan (1–0)	**Olivas** (1–1)	None	854	15–8	—
March 28	3:05 p.m.	ESPN+	No. 20 Oregon	—	Caesar Uyesaka Stadium	8–2	**Tryba** (1–2)	Clarke (4–2)	None	631	16–8	—
March 29	12:05 p.m.	ESPN+	No. 20 Oregon	—	Caesar Uyesaka Stadium	0–2	Scolari (4–0)	**Montgomery (2–2)**	Bell (6)	812	16–9	—
March 31	6:30 p.m.	B1G+	at No. 12 USC*	—	Dedeaux Field; Los Angeles, California	6–7	Herrell (3–1)	**Froling** (1–1)	Troy (9)	907	16–10	—

April (11–5)
Date	Time (PST)	TV	Opponent	Rank	Stadium	Score	Win	Loss	Save	Attendance	Overall	BWC
April 2	6:00 p.m.	ESPN+	at Cal Poly	—	Baggett Stadium; San Luis Obispo, California	6–0	**Flora (6–0)**	Naess (4–2)	None	2,287	17–10	6–4
April 3	6:00 p.m.	ESPN+	at Cal Poly	—	Baggett Stadium	4–2	**Tryba (2–2)**	Downs (2–1)	None	2,814	18–10	7–4
April 4	1:00 p.m.	ESPN+	at Cal Poly	—	Baggett Stadium	12–4	**Montgomery (5–2)**	Turnquist (2–1)	None	2,663	19–10	8–4
April 7	4:35 p.m.	ESPN+	No. 14 USC	—	Caesar Uyesaka Stadium; Santa Barbara, California	5–1	**Krodel (2–2)**	Herrell (3–2)	**Tryba (1)**	1,000	20–10	—
April 10	4:35 p.m.	ESPN+	UC San Diego	—	Caesar Uyesaka Stadium	3–4	Murdock (4–1)	**Tryba (2–3)**	King (1)	563	20–11	8–5
April 11	3:05 p.m.	ESPN+	UC San Diego	—	Caesar Uyesaka Stadium	11–10 (11)	**Jannicelli (1–1)**	Cazares (1–1)	None	795	21–11	9–5
April 12	1:05 p.m.	ESPN+	UC San Diego	—	Caesar Uyesaka Stadium	3–1	**Montgomery (6–2)**	Gregson (0–7)	**Froling (2)**	805	22–11	10–5
April 14	7:00 p.m.	BTN	at No. 1 UCLA	—	Jackie Robinson Stadium; Los Angeles, California	4–0	**Krodel (3–2)**	Cervantes (2–1)	**Tryba (2)**	880	23–11	—
April 17	6:00 p.m.	ESPN+	at UC Irvine	—	Cicerone Field; Irvine, California	7–3	**Flora (7–0)**	Hansen (4–4)	None	961	24–11	11–5
April 18	1:00 p.m.	ESPN+	at UC Irvine	—	Cicerone Field	3–6	Ojeda (3–3)	**Aceves (2–2)**	None	865	24–12	11–6
April 19	2:00 p.m.	ESPN2	at UC Irvine	—	Cicerone Field	8–4	**Tryba (3–3)**	Ross (2–1)	**Krodel (4)**	928	25–12	12–6
April 20	5:00 p.m.	ESPN+	at Cal Baptist	—	James W. Totman Stadium; Riverside, California	11–6	**Jannicelli (2–1)**	Teper (5–1)	**Hoover (3)**	438	26–12	—
April 24	4:35 p.m.	ESPN+	Cal State Fullerton	—	Caesar Uyesaka Stadium	8–3	**Flora (8–0)**	Negrete (7–3)	None	834	27–12	13–6
April 25	3:35 p.m.	ESPN+	Cal State Fullerton	—	Caesar Uyesaka Stadium	7–9	Wright (3–4)	**Tryba (3–4)**	None	775	27–13	13–7
April 26	1:05 p.m.	ESPN+	Cal State Fullerton	—	Caesar Uyesaka Stadium	1–6	Smith (3–4)	**Montgomery (6–3)**	None	611	27–14	13–8
April 28	4:35 p.m.	ESPN+	No. 1 UCLA*	—	Caesar Uyesaka Stadium	3–15 (7)	Cervantes (3–1)	**Froling (1–2)**	None	1,366	27–15	—

May (10–1)
Date	Time (PST)	TV	Opponent	Rank	Stadium	Score	Win	Loss	Save	Attendance	Overall	BWC
May 1	6:30 p.m.	ESPN+	at Cal State Bakersfield	—	Hardt Field; Bakersfield, California	18–1	**Flora (9–0)**	King (3–5)	**Jackson (1)**	447	28–15	14–8
May 2	6:30 p.m.	ESPN+	at Cal State Bakersfield	—	Hardt Field	4–3	**Tryba (4–4)**	Minaker (1–3)	**Hoover (4)**	345	29–15	15–8
May 3	1:00 p.m.	ESPN+	at Cal State Bakersfield	—	Hardt Field	19–9	**Aceves (3–2)**	Gutierrez (4–3)	None	278	30–15	16–8
May 5	4:35 p.m.	ESPN+	Pepperdine*	—	Caesar Uyesaka Stadium; Santa Barbara, California	13–3 (8)	**Olivas (2–1)**	Fowler (1–5)	**Tryba (3)**	659	31–15	—
May 8	5:00 p.m.	ESPN+	at Cal State Northridge	—	Matador Field; Northridge, California	8–4	**Hoover (1–0)**	King (3–2)	**Jannicelli (1)**	417	32–15	17–8
May 9	4:00 p.m.	ESPN+	at Cal State Northridge	—	Matador Field	5–4	**Froling (2–2)**	Voorhies (4–3)	**Jannicelli (2)**	357	33–15	18–8
May 10	1:00 p.m.	ESPN+	at Cal State Northridge	—	Matador Field	4–2	**Montgomery (7–3)**	Armijo (0–1)	**Tryba (4)**	295	34–15	19–8
May 11	4:35 p.m.	ESPN+	Cal Baptist	—	Caesar Uyesaka Stadium	3–8	Peck (7–1)	**Aceves (3–3)**	None	514	34–16	—
May 14	4:35 p.m.	ESPN+	UC Riverside	—	Caesar Uyesaka Stadium	1–0	**Flora (10–0)**	Torres (1–5)	None	775	35–16	20–8
May 15	4:35 p.m.	ESPN+	UC Riverside	—	Caesar Uyesaka Stadium	15–5	**Tryba (5–4)**	O'Brien (3–7)	None	759	36–16	21–8
May 16	1:05 p.m.	ESPN+	UC Riverside	—	Caesar Uyesaka Stadium	5–3	**Montgomery (8–3)**	DiGirolama (1–2)	**Jannicelli (3)**	844	37–16	22–8

Postseason (3–4)

Big West tournament (1–2)
Date	Time (PST)	TV	Opponent	Rank	Stadium	Score	Win	Loss	Save	Attendance	Overall	BWCT Record
May 21	1:00 p.m.	ESPN+	Cal State Fullerton (5)	(1)	Cicerone Field; Irvine, California	7–4	**Flora (11–0)**	Harper (0–2)	None	612	38–16	1–0
May 22	1:00 p.m.	ESPN+	Cal Poly (2)	(1)	Cicerone Field	2–4	Turnquist (8–2)	**Hoover (1–1)**	Bonn (14)	698	38–17	1–1
May 23	1:00 p.m.	ESPN+	UC San Diego (3)	(1)	Cicerone Field	0–7	Ries (3–3)	**Montgomery (8–4)**	None	587	38–18	1–2

Austin Regional (2–2)
Date	Time (PST)	TV	Opponent	Rank	Stadium	Score	Win	Loss	Save	Attendance	Overall	NCAA Tournament Record
May 29	3:00 p.m.	ESPN+	vs Tarleton State (3)	(2)	UFCU Disch-Falk Field; Austin, Texas	5–11	Davis (7–0)	**Proskey (0–1)**	Treto (8)	6,833	38–19	0–1
May 30	11:00 a.m.	ESPN+	vs Holy Cross (4)	(2)	UFCU Disch-Falk Field	15–1	**Flora (12–0)**	Lenahan (3–7)	None	6,634	39–19	1–1
May 31	10:00 a.m.	ESPN+	vs Tarleton State (3)	(2)	UFCU Disch-Falk Field	9–5	**Aceves (4–3)**	Carter (0–2)	None	6,720	40–19	2–1
May 31	3:00 p.m.	ESPN+	vs Texas (1)	(2)	UFCU Disch-Falk Field	4–6	Burns (1–0)	**Froling (2–3)**	Harrison (1)	7,884	40–20	2–2

*Non-conference game. ^{#}Rankings from D1Baseball. (#) Tournament seedings in parentheses.
All times are in Pacific.

== Awards ==
=== Preseason ===
==== National team ====
Preseason Perfect Game All-American First Team
Player	No.	Position	Class
Jackson Flora	2	RHP	Junior

Baseball America All-American First Team
Player	No.	Position	Class
Jackson Flora	2	RHP	Junior

Golden Spikes Award Watchlist
Player	No.	Position	Class
Jackson Flora	2	RHP	Junior

== Rankings ==
Ranking movements Legend: ██ Increase in ranking ██ Decrease in ranking — = Not ranked RV = Received votes
	Week																	
Poll	Pre	1	2	3	4	5	6	7	8	9	10	11	12	13	14	15	16	Final
Coaches'	RV	RV*	RV	RV	RV	RV	RV	—	—	RV	RV	—	RV	RV	RV	RV	RV*	
Baseball America	—	—	—	—	—	—	—	—	—	—	—	—	—	25	23	23*	23*	
NCBWA†	RV	RV	RV	RV	RV	RV	RV	—	RV	RV	RV	RV	RV	RV	RV	RV*	RV	
D1Baseball	—	—	—	—	—	—	—	—	—	—	—	—	—	—	—	—	—*	
Perfect Game	21	25	24	22	22	—	—	—	—	—	—	—	—	—	—	—*	—*	

† NCBWA ranks 30 teams in their preseason poll, but only ranks 25 teams weekly during the season.
* A new poll was not released for this week, so for comparison purposes, the previous week's ranking is inserted in this week's slot.
