= 2026 Hawaii Rainbow Warriors baseball team =

American college baseball season

2026 Hawaii Rainbow Warriors baseball
- Conference: Big West Conference
- Record: 27–23 (16–14 Big West)
- Head coach: Rich Hill (5th season)
- Associate head coach: Keith Zuniga (3rd season)
- Assistant coaches: Jordan Twohig (1st season); Rayson Romero (2nd season)
- Hitting coach: Dave Nakama (5th season)
- Pitching coach: Keith Zuniga (3rd season)
- Home stadium: Les Murakami Stadium

2026 Big West Conference baseball standings
	Conf.				Overall
Team	W		L	PCT	W		L	PCT
UC Santa Barbara ‍†‍‍^{y}	22	–	8	.733	38	–	19	.667
Cal Poly ‍‍‡‍^{y}	22	–	8	.733	37	–	22	.627
UC San Diego ‍‍‍	18	–	12	.600	27	–	28	.491
Hawai'i ‍‍‍	16	–	14	.533	27	–	23	.540
Cal State Fullerton ‍‍‍	15	–	15	.500	24	–	32	.429
UC Irvine ‍‍‍	14	–	16	.467	25	–	27	.481
UC Davis ‍‍‍	14	–	16	.467	26	–	28	.481
Cal State Northridge ‍‍‍	12	–	18	.400	25	–	28	.472
Cal State Bakersfield ‍‍‍	11	–	19	.367	21	–	32	.396
Long Beach State ‍‍‍	11	–	19	.367	17	–	35	.327
UC Riverside ‍‍‍	10	–	20	.333	15	–	37	.288
† – Conference champion ‡ – Tournament champion y – Invited to the NCAA tournament As of May 29, 2026; Rankings from D1Baseball

The 2026 Hawaii Rainbow Warriors baseball team represent the University of Hawaiʻi at Mānoa during the 2026 NCAA Division I baseball season. Hawaii is competing in the Big West Conference. The Rainbow Warriors played their home games at Les Murakami Stadium. Coach Rich Hill is leading the Rainbow Warriors in his fifth season with the program.

This is Hawaii's final season in the Big West Conference before joining the Mountain West Conference as a full-time member in 2027.

== Previous season ==
The 2025 Hawaii Rainbow Warriors baseball team notched an 35–21 (16–14) regular-season record during the 2025 season. The Rainbow Warriors finished fifth in the Big West Conference and went 1–2 in the 2025 Big West Conference baseball tournament. Hawaii did not receive an at-large berth into the NCAA tournament.

== Preseason ==
=== Coaches' Poll ===
The Big West Coaches' Poll and Team was released on February 6, 2026. Hawaii was predicted finish fourth in the conference in a tie with Cal State Fullerton.

Coaches' Poll
Pos.	Team	Points
1	UCSB	95 (5)
2	Cal Poly	89 (5)
3	UC Irvine	86 (1)
T-4	Cal State Fullerton	67
T-4	Hawai'i	67
6	UC San Diego	60
7	Long Beach State	41
8	UC Davis	40
9	CSUN	25
10	Cal State Bakersfield	22
11	UC Riverside	13

== Game log ==
2026 Hawai'i Rainbow Warriors baseball game log
(Overall: 26–21; Conference: 15–13); (Home: 19–9; Away: 7–12; Neutral: 0–0)
Regular season (26–21)
February (7–4)
(Home: 7–4; Away: 0–0)

Date	Time (HST)	Opponent	Rank	TV	Venue	Score	Win	Loss	Save	Attendance	Overall record	BWC record
OUTRIGGER Opening Series
February 13	6:35 p.m.	Gonzaga*		SSN	Les Murakami Stadium; Honolulu, HI	**W** 3–2^{(10)}	**Alkire II** (1–0)	Bowman (0–1)	—	4,371	1–0	—
February 14	6:35 p.m.	Gonzaga*			Les Murakami Stadium	**W** 5–3	**Robello** (1–0)	Hoffberg (0–1)	**Soto** (1)	4,363	2–0	—
February 15	1:05 p.m.	Gonzaga*		SSN	Les Murakami Stadium	**L** 2–7^{(12)}	Hood (1–0)	**Tenn** (0–1)	—	3,984	2–1	—
February 16	1:05 p.m.	Gonzaga*		SSN	Les Murakami Stadium	**W** 4–3	**Soto** (1–0)	Gores (0–1)	—	4,056	3–1	—
February 19	6:35 p.m.	Wichita State*			Les Murakami Stadium	**W** 7–6	**Garman** (1–0)	Morrison (0–1)	**Alkire II** (1)	3,394	4–1	—
February 20	6:35 p.m.	Wichita State*		SSN	Les Murakami Stadium	**W** 4–2	**Robello** (2–0)	Hamilton (1–1)	**Alkire II** (2)	3,544	5–1	—
February 22	11:05 a.m.	Wichita State*			Les Murakami Stadium	**L** 3–13^{(7)}	Nuanez (2–0)	**O'Brien** (0–1)	—	3,544	5–2	—
February 22	2:35 p.m.	Wichita State*			Les Murakami Stadium	**L** 1–7	Eddy (1–0)	**Grudzielanek** (0–1)	—	3,744	5–3	—
February 26	6:35 p.m.	Ball State*			Les Murakami Stadium	**W** 6–1	**Magdaleno** (1–0)	Chambers (0–1)	—	3,400	6–3	—
February 27	6:35 p.m.	Ball State*			Les Murakami Stadium	**W** 12–0	**Robello** (3–0)	Johnson (0–1)	—	3,705	7–3	—
February 28	11:05 a.m.	Ball State*			Les Murakami Stadium	**L** 0–1	Garza (2–1)	**Grudzielanek** (0–2)	—	4,329	7–4	—

March (8–7)
(Home: 5–4; Away: 3–3)

Date	Time (EDT)	Opponent	Rank	TV	Venue	Score	Win	Loss	Save	Attendance	Overall record	BWC record
March 1	2:35 p.m.	Ball State*			Les Murakami Stadium	**W** 6–0	**O'Brien** (1–1)	Jones (0–1)	—	3,729	8–4	—
March 6	6:35 p.m.	Cal Poly			Les Murakami Stadium	**L** 2–6	Næss (2–1)	**Magdaleno** (1–1)	Bonn (2)	4,196	8–5	0–1
March 7	6:35 p.m.	Cal Poly		SSN	Les Murakami Stadium	**L** 7–10^{(11)}	Estes (1–0)	**Alkire II** (1–1)	—	4,379	8–6	0–2
March 8	1:05 p.m.	Cal Poly			Les Murakami Stadium	**L** 3–7	Turnquist (1–0)	**Grudzielanek** (0–3)	Bonn (3)	4,155	8–7	0–3
March 10	6:35 p.m.	Chaminade*		SSN	Les Murakami Stadium	**W** 15–0^{(7)}	Næss (2–1)	Till (0–2)	—	3,388	9–7	—
March 13	3:05 p.m.	at Long Beach State		ESPN+	Blair Field; Long Beach, CA	**W** 11–1	**Magdaleno** (2–1)	Fields (1–3)	—	2,479	10–7	1–3
March 14	3:05 p.m.	at Long Beach State		ESPN+	Blair Field	**L** 6–7	Howe (3–0)	**Robello** (3–1)	Ramos (1)	1,847	10–8	1–4
March 15	10:05 a.m.	at Long Beach State		ESPN+	Blair Field	**L** 1–2	Gerfers (1–1)	**O'Brien** (1–2)	—	1,778	10–9	1–5
March 20	1:35 p.m.	at UCSB		ESPN+	Caesar Uyesaka Stadium; Santa Barbara, CA	**W** 2–1	**Magdaleno** (3–1)	Tryba (0–1)	**Alkire II** (3)	486	11–9	2–5
March 21	12:05 p.m.	at UCSB		ESPN+	Caesar Uyesaka Stadium	**W** 3–1	**Robello** (4–1)	Aceves (2–1)	**Alkire II** (4)	696	12–9	3–5
March 22	10:05 a.m.	at UCSB		ESPN+	Caesar Uyesaka Stadium	**L** 1–5	Montgomery (4–1)	**O'Brien** (1–3)	Van Froling (1)	684	12–10	3–6
March 25	6:35 p.m.	Hawaii Pacific*		SSN	Les Murakami Stadium	**W** 4–1	**Tomii** (1–0)	Rhea (0–2)	**Inouye** (1)	3,764	13–10	—
March 27	6:35 p.m.	Cal State Fullerton			Les Murakami Stadium	**L** 0–2	Negrete (4–2)	**Magdaleno** (3–2)	—	4,354	13–11	3–7
March 28	6:35 p.m.	Cal State Fullerton			Les Murakami Stadium	**W** 6–2	**Robello** (5–1)	Mahoney (0–1)	—	4,406	14–11	4–7
March 29	1:05 p.m.	Cal State Fullerton			Les Murakami Stadium	**W** 6–5^{(10)}	**Soto** (2–0)	Wright (2–2)	—	4,337	15–11	5–7

April (6–8)
(Home; 3–1; Away: 3–7)

Date	Time (HST)	Opponent	Rank	TV	Venue	Score	Win	Loss	Save	Attendance	Overall record	BWC record
April 2	3:00 p.m.	at UC San Diego		ESPN+	Triton Ballpark; La Jolla, CA	**L** 9–10	King (2–0)	**Alkire II** (1–2)	Cazares (2)	505	15–12	5–8
April 3	3:00 p.m.	at UC San Diego		ESPN+	Triton Ballpark	**W** 6–3	**Magdaleno** (4–2)	Gregson (0–6)	—	518	16–12	6–8
April 4	11:00 a.m.	at UC San Diego		ESPN+	Triton Ballpark	**L** 0–8	Bowker (2–1)	**Robello** (5–2)	—	542	16–13	6–9
April 10	6:35 p.m.	UC Irvine		SSN	Les Murakami Stadium	**W** 14–6	**Tomii** (2–0)	Hansen (4–3)	—	3,829	17–13	7–9
April 11	6:35 p.m.	UC Irvine		SSN	Les Murakami Stadium	**W** 3–0	**Robello** (6–2)	Wall (3–2)	**Grudzielanek** (1)	4,532	18–13	9–9
April 12	1:05 p.m.	UC Irvine			Les Murakami Stadium	**L** 1–5	Ojeda (2–3)	**O'Brien** (1–4)	Suarez (2)	4,462	18–14	8–10
April 17	3:30 p.m.	at Cal State Bakersfield		ESPN+	Hardt Field; Bakersfield, CA	**L** 0–2	King (3–3)	**Magdaleno** (4–3)	Gutierrez (2)	509	18–15	8–11
April 18	1:00 p.m.	at Cal State Bakersfield		ESPN+	Hardt Field	**W** 5–3	**Robello** (7–2)	Minaker (0–2)	**Grudzielanek** (2)	473	19–15	9–11
April 19	10:00 a.m.	at Cal State Bakersfield		ESPN+	Hardt Field	**W** 14–5	**Tomii** (3–0)	McAlinden (3–5)	—	375	20–15	10–11
April 21	6:00 p.m.	at No. 1 UCLA*		BTN	Jackie Robinson Stadium; Los Angeles, CA	**L** 7–12	May (1–0)	**Grudzielanek** (0–4)	—	669	20–16	—
April 24	2:35 p.m.	at No. 6 Oregon State*		P12N	Goss Stadium; Corvallis, OR	**L** 4–12	Whitney (6–1)	**Magdaleno** (4–4)	—	3,977	20–17	—
April 25	12:05 p.m.	at No. 6 Oregon State*		P12N	Hardt Field	**L** 1–8	Kleinschmit (7–2)	**Robello** (7–3)	—	4,090	20–18	—
April 26	10:05 a.m.	at No. 6 Oregon State*		P12N	Hardt Field	**L** 1–3	Yeager (5–1)	**Tomii** (3–1)	Roblez (12)	4,020	20–19	—
April 29	6:35 p.m.	Hawaii–Hilo*		SSN	Les Murakami Stadium	**W** 11–3	**Waite** (2–0)	Hiraki (0–2)	—	3,875	21–19	—

May (5–2)
(Home; 4–0; Away: 1–2)

Date	Time (HST)	Opponent	Rank	TV	Venue	Score	Win	Loss	Save	Attendance	Overall record	BWC record
May 1	6:35 p.m.	UC Riverside		SSN	Les Murakami Stadium	**W** 1–0	**Magdaleno** (5–4)	Torres (1–3)	—	4,342	22–19	11–11
May 2	6:35 p.m.	UC Riverside		SSN	Les Murakami Stadium	**W** 9–1	**Robello** (8–3)	O'Brien (3–5)	—	4,409	23–19	12–11
May 3	1:05 p.m.	UC Riverside		SSN	Les Murakami Stadium	**W** 10–5	**Alkire II** (2–2)	Hernandez (0–1)	—	4,347	24–19	13–11
May 8	3:00 p.m.	at UC Davis			Dobbins Stadium; Davis, CA	**W** 4–1	**Magdaleno** (6–4)	Bonanno (0–2)	**Tomii** (1)	812	25–19	14–11
May 9	3:00 p.m.	at UC Davis			Dobbins Stadium	**L** 2–4	Pezzolo (2–2)	**Robello** (8–4)	Barnes (11)	547	25–20	14–12
May 10	10:00 a.m.	at UC Davis			Dobbins Stadium	**L** 10–5	Wood (2–2)	**Grudzielanek** (0–5)	Barnes (12)	371	25–21	14–13
May 13	6:35 p.m.	CSUN		SSN	Les Murakami Stadium	**W** 4–0	**Magdaleno** (7–4)	Hernandez (4–4)	—	3,968	26–21	15–13
May 14	6:35 p.m.	CSUN		SSN	Les Murakami Stadium							
May 15	6:35 p.m.	CSUN		SSN	Les Murakami Stadium							

Postseason (0–0)
Big West tournament (0–0)

Date	Time (HST)	Opponent	Rank	TV	Venue	Score	Win	Loss	Save	Attendance	Overall record	Tournament record
May 20	TBD	vs. (5) Cal State Fullerton	(4)	TBD	Cicerone Field; Irvine, CA						—	—

"#" represents ranking. All rankings from D1Baseball Poll on the date of the contest.
"()" represents postseason seeding in the BWC Tournament or NCAA Regional, respectively.
= Win, = Loss, = Canceled/Postponed
Bold = **Hawai'i team member**
* = Non-Conference Game
Schedule Source:

Schedule Notes:

== Rankings ==
Ranking movements Legend: ██ Increase in ranking ██ Decrease in ranking — = Not ranked RV = Received votes
	Week																
Poll	Pre	1	2	3	4	5	6	7	8	9	10	11	12	13	14	15	Final
Coaches'	—	—*	RV	—	—	—	—	—	—	—	—	—	—	—	—	—	—
Baseball America	—	—	—	—	—	—	—	—	—	—	—	—	—	—	—	—	—
NCBWA†	RV	RV	RV	—	—	—	—	—	—	—	—	—	—	—	—	—	—
D1Baseball	—	—	—	—	—	—	—	—	—	—	—	—	—	—	—	—	—
Perfect Game	—	—	—	—	—	—	—	—	—	—	—	—	—	—	—	—	—

† NCBWA ranks 30 teams in their preseason poll, but only ranks 25 teams weekly during the season.
* A new poll was not released for this week, so for comparison purposes, the previous week's ranking is inserted in this week's slot.
