= 2026 UC Irvine Anteaters baseball team =

American college baseball season

2026 UC Irvine Anteaters baseball
- Conference: Big West Conference
- Record: 25–27 (14–16 Big West)
- Head coach: Ben Orloff (8th season)
- Assistant coaches: Ryan Johnston (4th season); Erich Pfohl (3rd season); CJ Yogi (3rd season)
- Hitting coach: J.T. Bloodworth (8th season)
- Pitching coach: Daniel Bibona (14th season)
- Home stadium: Cicerone Field

2026 Big West Conference baseball standings
	Conf.				Overall
Team	W		L	PCT	W		L	PCT
UC Santa Barbara ‍†‍‍^{y}	22	–	8	.733	40	–	20	.667
Cal Poly ‍‍‡‍^{y}	22	–	8	.733	39	–	22	.639
UC San Diego ‍‍‍	18	–	12	.600	27	–	28	.491
Hawai'i ‍‍‍	16	–	14	.533	27	–	23	.540
Cal State Fullerton ‍‍‍	15	–	15	.500	24	–	32	.429
UC Irvine ‍‍‍	14	–	16	.467	25	–	27	.481
UC Davis ‍‍‍	14	–	16	.467	26	–	28	.481
Cal State Northridge ‍‍‍	12	–	18	.400	25	–	28	.472
Cal State Bakersfield ‍‍‍	11	–	19	.367	21	–	32	.396
Long Beach State ‍‍‍	11	–	19	.367	17	–	35	.327
UC Riverside ‍‍‍	10	–	20	.333	15	–	37	.288
† – Conference champion ‡ – Tournament champion y – Invited to the NCAA tournament As of May 31, 2026; Rankings from D1Baseball

The 2026 UC Irvine Anteaters baseball team represent the University of California, Irvine during the 2026 NCAA Division I baseball season. The Anteaters will play their home games at Cicerone Field as a member of the Big West Conference. They are led by head coach Ben Orloff in his eighth season as manager. The top five teams in the Big West Conference will play in the conference's postseason tournament, with the winner receiving the automatic bid to the 2026 NCAA tournament. It was announced on January 9, 2026, that head coach Ben Orloff signed a 5-year contract extension, keeping him with the team until the end of the 2030 season. Despite hosting this year's Big West tournament, UC Irvine failed to make the field, being eliminated from contention on the penultimate day of the season. It marked the first season since 2023 the Anteaters did not make the NCAA tournament, as well as the first season since 2017 that they did not post a winning record, the first under Coach Orloff.

== Previous season ==
Last season, UC Irvine finished with a 43–17 record, going 24–6 in the Big West, and finishing first in the conference. They fell in the conference championship in back-to-back games against Cal Poly. They received an at-large bid to the 2025 NCAA Division I Baseball Tournament, along with conference tournament champion Cal Poly. The Anteaters went 2–2 in NCAA tournament play, falling to UCLA in the regional finals 5–8. UC Irvine finished the season ranked 25th in the nation by D1Baseball.com and 23rd by the USA Today Coaches Poll.

== Preseason ==
=== Big West Preseason Poll and Team ===
The Big West Coaches' Poll and Team was released on February 6, 2026. UC Irvine was predicted to finish third in the conference, and had two players make the preseason team.

Coaches' Poll
Pos.	Team	Points
1	UC Santa Barbara	95 (5)
2	Cal Poly	89 (5)
3	UC Irvine	86 (1)
T-4	Cal State Fullerton	67
T-4	Hawai'i	67
6	UC San Diego	60
7	Long Beach State	41
8	UC Davis	40
9	CSUN	25
10	Cal State Bakersfield	22
11	UC Riverside	13

Preseason Coaches' Team
Player	No.	Position	Class
Trevor Hansen	28	RHP	Junior
Ricky Ojeda	13	LHP	Junior

== Personnel ==
=== Starters ===
Lineup
Pos.	No.	Player.	Year
C	50	Efren Ortega	Sophomore
1B	25	Alonso Reyes	RS Junior
2B	26	Noah Alvarez	Senior
3B	5	James Castagnola	RS Junior
SS	36	Zach Fjelstad	Junior
LF	9	Rowan Felsch	Senior
CF	2	Tommy Farmer	Junior
RF	23	Frankie Carney	RS Junior
DH	21	Landon Gaz	Junior

Weekend pitching rotation
Day	No.	Player.	Year
Friday	28	Trevor Hansen	Junior
Saturday	13	Ricky Ojeda	Junior
Sunday	41	Cade Castles	Freshman

=== Roster ===
2026 UC Irvine Anteaters baseball team
Players
Coaches

#	Pos.	Name	B/T	Height	Weight	Year	Home town
1	INF	Theo Kim	S/R	6 ft 2 in (1.88 m)	205 lb (93 kg)	So	Rancho Bernardo, CA
2	OF	Tommy Farmer	R/R	6 ft 3 in (1.91 m)	210 lb (95 kg)	Jr	Santa Monica, CA
4	OF	Davis D'Errico	R/R	5 ft 11 in (1.8 m)	195 lb (88 kg)	RS So	Los Alamitos, CA
5	INF	James Castagnola	R/R	6 ft 1 in (1.85 m)	195 lb (88 kg)	RS Jr	San Diego, CA
8	INF	Dylan Hillman	R/R	5 ft 11 in (1.8 m)	180 lb (82 kg)	So	Danville, CA
9	OF	Rowan Felsch	L/L	6 ft 2 in (1.88 m)	200 lb (91 kg)	Sr	Palo Alto, CA
10	OF	Zach Doyle	L/L	5 ft 10 in (1.78 m)	180 lb (82 kg)	RS Fr	Ladera Ranch, CA
11	RHP	Jack Ross	R/R	6 ft 3 in (1.91 m)	200 lb (91 kg)	Sr	Huntington Beach, CA
12	OF	Kai Smith	R/R	6 ft 0 in (1.83 m)	190 lb (86 kg)	Fr	Danville, CA
13	LHP	Ricky Ojeda	L/L	5 ft 11 in (1.8 m)	185 lb (84 kg)	Jr	Valencia, CA
14	RHP	Danny Suarez	R/R	6 ft 3 in (1.91 m)	210 lb (95 kg)	RS Sr	Trabuco Canyon, CA
15	RHP	Finnegan Wall	R/R	6 ft 2 in (1.88 m)	205 lb (93 kg)	RS Sr	Hesperia, CA
16	C	Michael Podstreleny	L/R	5 ft 11 in (1.8 m)	190 lb (86 kg)	RS Fr	San Diego, CA
17	LHP	Dane Grant	L/L	6 ft 2 in (1.88 m)	185 lb (84 kg)	RS So	San Juan Capistrano, CA
18	C	Zach Crandall	R/R	6 ft 0 in (1.83 m)	200 lb (91 kg)	RS Sr	Rancho Santa Margarita, CA
20	RHP	Tim Grack	R/R	6 ft 1 in (1.85 m)	195 lb (88 kg)	RS So	Fountain Valley, CA
21	UTL	Landon Gaz	R/R	6 ft 2 in (1.88 m)	235 lb (107 kg)	Jr	Moorpark, CA
22	RHP	David Butler	R/R	6 ft 1 in (1.85 m)	185 lb (84 kg)	Sr	Riverside, CA
23	INF	Frankie Carney	L/R	5 ft 10 in (1.78 m)	180 lb (82 kg)	RS Jr	San Diego, CA
24	INF	Auggie Gutierrez	R/R	5 ft 11 in (1.8 m)	190 lb (86 kg)	RS Jr	Yorba Linda, CA
25	UTL	Alonso Reyes	L/R	6 ft 0 in (1.83 m)	195 lb (88 kg)	RS Jr	Inglewood, CA
26	INF	Noah Alvarez	L/R	6 ft 2 in (1.88 m)	180 lb (82 kg)	Sr	Chino, CA
27	LHP	Brandon Luu	L/L	6 ft 2 in (1.88 m)	205 lb (93 kg)	RS So	Irvine, CA
28	RHP	Trevor Hansen	R/R	6 ft 2 in (1.88 m)	195 lb (88 kg)	Jr	Simi Valley, CA
30	RHP	Peyton Rodgers	R/R	6 ft 0 in (1.83 m)	180 lb (82 kg)	So	Solana Beach, CA
31	INF	Lucas Schermer	R/R	6 ft 3 in (1.91 m)	198 lb (90 kg)	Fr	Hermosa Beach, CA
32	LHP	Zane Nordquist	L/L	5 ft 11 in (1.8 m)	175 lb (79 kg)	Fr	Oceanside, CA
33	RHP	Tyler Foster	R/R	6 ft 1 in (1.85 m)	190 lb (86 kg)	So	Carlsbad, CA
34	INF	Cole Clark	L/R	6 ft 1 in (1.85 m)	175 lb (79 kg)	Fr	Huntington Beach, CA
35	C	Connor Dietsch	R/R	6 ft 3 in (1.91 m)	198 lb (90 kg)	RS Jr	Mission Viejo, CA
36	INF	Zach Fjelstad	L/R	5 ft 11 in (1.8 m)	190 lb (86 kg)	Jr	Coto de Caza, CA
37	RHP	Julian Custer	R/R	6 ft 2 in (1.88 m)	185 lb (84 kg)	RS So	San Diego, CA
38	OF	Daniel Polasek	L/R	5 ft 11 in (1.8 m)	190 lb (86 kg)	So	Martinez, CA
40	RHP	Hunter Manning	L/R	6 ft 5 in (1.96 m)	220 lb (100 kg)	Fr	Valencia, CA
41	RHP	Cade Castles	R/R	6 ft 2 in (1.88 m)	175 lb (79 kg)	Fr	Davis, CA
42	LHP	Ryder Brooks	L/L	6 ft 3 in (1.91 m)	200 lb (91 kg)	RS Jr	Fountain Valley, CA
44	UTL	Alex Schmidt	R/R	6 ft 2 in (1.88 m)	215 lb (98 kg)	Fr	Sherman Oaks, CA
45	LHP	Jaxton Andeel	L/L	6 ft 4 in (1.93 m)	210 lb (95 kg)	Sr	Placentia, CA
50	C	Efren Ortega	R/R	5 ft 11 in (1.8 m)	190 lb (86 kg)	So	Sylmar, CA
55	RHP	Alex Umland	R/R	6 ft 4 in (1.93 m)	220 lb (100 kg)	RS Fr	Los Angeles, CA

Head coach

Ben Orloff

Assistant coach(es)

Daniel Bibona
J.T. Bloodworth
Ryan Johnston

Legend

- (C) Team captain
- (S) Suspended
- (I) Ineligible
- Injured
- Current redshirt

Roster
Last update: January 19, 2026

== Schedule ==
Legend
	Anteaters win
	Anteaters loss
	Postponement
**Bold**	Anteaters team member

2026 UC Irvine Anteaters baseball game log (25–27)
Regular season (25–27)

February (8–3)
Date	Time (PST)	TV	Opponent	Rank	Stadium	Score	Win	Loss	Save	Attendance	Overall	BWC
February 13	6:00 p.m.	ESPN+	at Sacramento State*	—	John Smith Field; Sacramento, California	5–0	**Hansen (1–0)**	Monson (0–1)	**Brooks (1)**	540	1–0	—
February 14 (DH)	2:00 p.m.	WAC International	at Sacramento State*	—	John Smith Field	7–3	**Ojeda (1–0)**	Wilson (0–1)	None	521	2–0	—
February 14 (DH) (Note: While initially scheduled for February 15 at 12:00 p.m. on ESPN+, the game was moved to February 14 on WAC International as a doubleheader due to impending weather.)	5:00 p.m.	WAC International	at Sacramento State*	—	John Smith Field	6–2	**Wall (1–0)**	Winterhalder (0–1)	**Rodgers (1)**	583	3–0	—
February 18 (Note: While initially scheduled for February 17 at 6:00 p.m., the game was moved to February 18 at 6:00 p.m. due to impending weather.)	6:00 p.m.	ESPN+	San Diego State*	—	Cicerone Field; Irvine, California	5–2	**Ross (1–0)**	Belardes (0–1)	None	642	4–0	—
February 20	6:00 p.m.	ESPN+	California*	—	Cicerone Field	5–3	**Hansen (2–0)**	De La Torre (0–2)	**Rodgers (2)**	1,031	5–0	—
February 21	1:00 p.m.	ESPN+	California*	—	Cicerone Field	2–11	Foley (1–0)	**Ojeda (1–1)**	Espinoza (1)	984	5–1	—
February 22	1:00 p.m.	ESPN+	California*	—	Cicerone Field	2–4	Eddy (1–0)	**Castles (0–1)**	Kreis (1)	894	5–2	—
February 24	6:00 p.m.	ESPN+	Grand Canyon*	—	Cicerone Field	3–0	**Rodgers (1–0)**	McGuire (0–1)	**Brooks (2)**	632	6–2	—
February 25	1:00 p.m.	ESPN+	Grand Canyon*	—	Cicerone Field	4–9 (10)	Cunnings (1–0)	**Rodgers (1–1)**	None	566	6–3	—
Live Like Lou Las Vegas College Baseball Classic
February 27	2:00 p.m.	D1Baseball	vs. Vanderbilt*	—	Las Vegas Ballpark; Las Vegas, Nevada	9–4	**Hansen (3–0)**	Bryan (0–1)	None	4,722	7–3	—
February 28	12:00 p.m.	D1Baseball	vs. Oregon*	—	Las Vegas Ballpark	8–6	**Grack (1–0)**	Bell (0–1)	**Manning (1)**	5,713	8–3	—

March (3–14)
Date	Time (PST)	TV	Opponent	Rank	Stadium	Score	Win	Loss	Save	Attendance	Overall	BWC
Live Like Lou Las Vegas College Baseball Classic
March 1	3:00 p.m.	D1Baseball	vs. Arizona*	—	Las Vegas Ballpark; Las Vegas, Nevada	1–7	Fladda (1–0)	**Castles (0–2)**	None	5,304	8–4	—
March 3	6:00 p.m.	B1G+	at USC*	—	Dedeaux Field; Los Angeles, California	4–6	Fausset (2–0)	**Brooks (0–1)**	Matson (1)	598	8–5	—
March 6	6:00 p.m.	ESPN+	Cal State Northridge	—	Cicerone Field; Irvine, California	4–5	Voorhies (1–0)	**Manning (0–1)**	None	675	8–6	0–1
March 7	1:00 p.m.	ESPN+	Cal State Northridge	—	Cicerone Field	4–2	**Grack (2–0)**	Johnson (2–2)	None	627	9–6	1–1
March 8	1:00 p.m.	ESPN+	Cal State Northridge	—	Cicerone Field	2–9	Turner (1–0)	**Brooks (0–2)**	None	697	9–7	1–2
March 10	6:00 p.m.	B1G+	at No. 1 UCLA*	—	Jackie Robinson Field; Pasadena, California	1–11 (7)	Cervantes (1–0)	**Castles (0–3)**	None	544	9–8	—
March 13	6:30 p.m.	ESPN+	at Cal State Fullerton	—	Goodwin Field; Fullerton, California	3–8	Negrete (3–1)	**Grack (2–1)**	None	1,008	9–9	1–3
March 14	5:00 p.m.	ESPN+	at Cal State Fullerton	—	Goodwin Field	5–9	Smith (1–2)	**Ojeda (1–2)**	None	1,125	9–10	1–4
March 15	1:00 p.m.	ESPN+	at Cal State Fullerton	—	Goodwin Field	6–8	Wright (2–1)	**Brooks (0–3)**	None	821	9–11	1–5
March 20	6:00 p.m.	ESPN+	No. 17 Oregon State*	—	Cicerone Field	1–5	Whitney (4–0)	**Hansen (3–1)**	None	1,008	9–12	—
March 21	1:00 p.m.	ESPN+	No. 17 Oregon State*	—	Cicerone Field	3–5	Kleinschmit (3–2)	**Ojeda (1–3)**	Roblez (7)	936	9–13	—
March 22	1:00 p.m.	ESPN+	No. 17 Oregon State*	—	Cicerone Field	5–9	Morris (1–0)	**Wall (1–1)**	Edwards (1)	1,004	9–14	—
March 24	6:00 p.m.	Mountain West Network	at San Diego State*	—	Tony Gwynn Stadium; San Diego, California	4–8	McKnight (2–0)	**Foster (0–1)**	Abadie (2)	649	9–15	—
March 27	6:05 p.m.	ESPN+	at Long Beach State	—	Blair Field; Long Beach, California	2–10	Anderson (1–3)	**Hansen (3–2)**	None	2,313	9–16	1–6
March 28	6:05 p.m.	—	at Long Beach State	—	Blair Field	12–9 (11)	**Suarez (1–0)**	Larson (0–2)	None	1,797	10–16	2–6
March 29	1:05 p.m.	ESPN+	at Long Beach State	—	Blair Field	7–1	**(Wall 2–1)**	Gerfers (2–2)	None	1,820	11–16	3–6
March 31	6:00 p.m.	ESPN+	No. 1 UCLA*	—	Cicerone Field	1–9	Cervantes (2–0)	**Grant** (0–1)	None	2,685	11–17	—

April (8–6)
Date	Time (PST)	TV	Opponent	Rank	Stadium	Score	Win	Loss	Save	Attendance	Overall	BWC
April 2	6:00 p.m.	ESPN+	UC Davis	—	Cicerone Field; Irvine, California	4–1	**Hansen (4–2)**	Anzai (2–2)	**Suarez (1)**	574	12–17	4–6
April 3	6:00 p.m.	ESPN+	UC Davis	—	Cicerone Field	7–2	**Ross (2–0)**	Valdez (1–4)	**Ojeda (1)**	722	13–17	5–6
April 4	1:00 p.m.	ESPN+	UC Davis	—	Cicerone Field	8–4	**Wall (3–1)**	Pezzolo (0–1)	None	700	14–17	6–6
April 7	6:00 p.m.	ESPN+	San Diego*	—	Cicerone Field	13–5	**Foster (1–1)**	Garcia (0–1)	None	725	15–17	—
April 10	9:35 p.m.	ESPN+	at Hawai'i	—	Les Murakami Stadium; Honolulu, Hawaii	6–14	Tomii (2–0)	**Hansen (4–3)**	None	3,829	15–18	6–7
April 11	9:35 p.m.	ESPN+	at Hawai'i	—	Les Murakami Stadium	0–3	Robello (6–2)	**Wall (3–2)**	Martin-Grudzielanek (1)	4,532	15–19	6–8
April 12	4:05 p.m.	—	at Hawai'i	—	Les Murakami Stadium	5–1	**Ojeda (2–3)**	O'Brien (1–4)	**Suarez (2)**	4,462	16–19	7–8
April 17	6:00 p.m.	ESPN+	UC Santa Barbara	—	Cicerone Field	3–7	Flora (7–0)	**Hansen (4–4)**	None	961	16–20	7–9
April 18	1:00 p.m.	ESPN+	UC Santa Barbara	—	Cicerone Field	6–3	**Ojeda (3–3)**	Aceves (2–2)	None	865	17–20	8–9
April 19	2:00 p.m.	ESPN2	UC Santa Barbara	—	Cicerone Field	4–8	Tryba (3–3)	**Ross (2–1)**	Krodel (4)	928	17–21	8–10
April 24	6:00 p.m.	ESPN+	at UC San Diego	—	Triton Ballpark; La Jolla, California	10–11	Cazares (2–1)	**Suarez (1–1)**	Huy (1)	615	17–22	8–11
April 25	2:00 p.m.	ESPN+	at UC San Diego	—	Triton Ballpark	4–9	Bowker (3–1)	**Wall** (3–3)	None	462	17–23	8–12
April 26	1:00 p.m.	ESPN+	at UC San Diego	—	Triton Ballpark	9–7	**Suarez** (2–1)	Cazares (2–2)	None	454	18–23	9–12
April 28	6:00 p.m.	ESPN+	No. 21 USC*	—	Cicerone Field	4–1	**Butler (1–0)**	Herrell (3–4)	**Rodgers (3)**	1,666	19–23	—

May (6–4)
Date	Time (PST)	TV	Opponent	Rank	Stadium	Score	Win	Loss	Save	Attendance	Overall	BWC
May 1	6:00 p.m.	ESPN+	Cal Poly	—	Cicerone Field; Irvine, California	11–4	**Hansen (5–4)**	Naess (5–3)	None	1,000	20–23	10–12
May 2	1:00 p.m.	ESPN+	Cal Poly	—	Cicerone Field	2–11	Turnquist (5–2)	**Wall (3–4)**	Downs (1)	732	20–24	10–13
May 3	1:00 p.m.	ESPN+	Cal Poly	—	Cicerone Field	6–8	Bonn (1–4)	**Suarez (2–2)**	None	951	20–25	10–14
May 5	6:00 p.m.	ESPN+	at San Diego*	—	Fowler Park; San Diego, California	9–4	**Brooks (1–3)**	Shannon (0–1)	None	421	21–25	—
May 8	2:00 p.m.	ESPN+	at UC Riverside	—	Riverside Sports Complex; Riverside, California	17–5	**Hansen (6–4)**	Torres (1–4)	None	134	22–25	11–14
May 9	1:00 p.m.	ESPN+	at UC Riverside	—	Riverside Sports Complex	15–3	**Brooks (2–3)**	O'brien (3–5)	None	157	23–25	12–14
May 10	1:00 p.m.	ESPN+	at UC Riverside	—	Riverside Sports Complex	3–5	Byrd (2–1)	**Suarez (2–3)**	Hudson (1)	217	23–26	12–15
May 14	6:00 p.m.	ESPN+	Cal State Bakersfield	—	Cicerone Field	6–3	**Hansen (7–4)**	Myers (3–3)	**Ojeda (2)**	605	24–26	13–15
May 15	6:00 p.m.	ESPN+	Cal State Bakersfield	—	Cicerone Field	0–4	King (4–6)	**Wall (3–5)**	None	772	24–27	13–16
May 16	1:00 p.m.	ESPN+	Cal State Bakersfield	—	Cicerone Field	10–7	**Suarez (3–3)**	Minaker (1–4)	**Ojeda (3)**	778	25–27	14–16

*Non-conference game. ^{#}Rankings from D1Baseball. (#) Tournament seedings in parentheses.
All times are in Pacific.

== Awards ==
=== Preseason ===
==== National team ====
Preseason Perfect Game All-American First Team
Player	No.	Position	Class
Ricky Ojeda	13	LHP	Junior

Preseason NCBWA All-American First Team
Player	No.	Position	Class
Ricky Ojeda	13	LHP	Junior

Preseason D1Baseball All-American Third Team
Player	No.	Position	Class
Ricky Ojeda	13	LHP	Junior

Golden Spikes Award Watchlist
Player	No.	Position	Class
Ricky Ojeda	13	LHP	Junior

==== Conference ====
D1Baseball Big West Preseason Awards
Honor	Player	No.	Position	Class
Freshman of the Year	Cade Castles	41	RHP	Freshman
Pitcher of the Year	Ricky Ojeda	13	LHP	Junior

== Rankings ==
Ranking movements Legend: ██ Increase in ranking ██ Decrease in ranking — = Not ranked RV = Received votes
	Week																
Poll	Pre	1	2	3	4	5	6	7	8	9	10	11	12	13	14	15	Final
Coaches'	RV	RV*	—	RV	—												
Baseball America	—	—	—	—	—												
NCBWA†	RV	RV	RV	RV	—												
D1Baseball	—	—	—	—	—												
Perfect Game	—	—	—	—	—												

† NCBWA ranks 30 teams in their preseason poll, but only ranks 25 teams weekly during the season.
* A new poll was not released for this week, so for comparison purposes, the previous week's ranking is inserted in this week's slot.
