= 2026 Big West Conference baseball tournament =

American college baseball tournament

- Teams: 5
- Format: Double-elimination tournament
- Finals site: Cicerone Field at Anteater Ballpark; Irvine, CA
- Champions: Cal Poly (2nd title)
- Winning coach: Larry Lee (2nd title)
- MVP: Nick Bonn (Cal Poly)
- Television: ESPN+

2026 Big West Conference baseball standings
	Conf.				Overall
Team	W		L	PCT	W		L	PCT
UC Santa Barbara ‍†‍‍^{y}	22	–	8	.733	40	–	20	.667
No. 19 Cal Poly ‍‍‡‍^{y}	22	–	8	.733	39	–	24	.619
UC San Diego ‍‍‍	18	–	12	.600	27	–	28	.491
Hawai'i ‍‍‍	16	–	14	.533	27	–	23	.540
Cal State Fullerton ‍‍‍	15	–	15	.500	24	–	32	.429
UC Irvine ‍‍‍	14	–	16	.467	25	–	27	.481
UC Davis ‍‍‍	14	–	16	.467	26	–	28	.481
Cal State Northridge ‍‍‍	12	–	18	.400	25	–	28	.472
Cal State Bakersfield ‍‍‍	11	–	19	.367	21	–	32	.396
Long Beach State ‍‍‍	11	–	19	.367	17	–	35	.327
UC Riverside ‍‍‍	10	–	20	.333	15	–	37	.288
† – Conference champion ‡ – Tournament champion y – Invited to the NCAA tournament As of June 6, 2026; Rankings from D1Baseball

The 2026 Big West Conference baseball tournament determined the conference champion for the Big West Conference at the end of the 2026 college baseball season. The top five teams met at UC Irvine's on campus venue, Cicerone Field at Anteater Ballpark from May 20 through 24. This was the second Big West Conference postseason championship event since the 1998 season. The winner, Cal Poly, received the conference's automatic bid to the NCAA playoffs. This also marks the second year in a row that Cal Poly won the title.

== Seeding and format ==
The top five finishers from the regular season were seeded one through five based on conference winning percentage. Seeds No. 1, No. 2, and No. 3 received a bye into the double elimination bracket, while No. 4 and No. 5 battled in a single elimination game in the first round.

Seed	School	Record	Tiebreaker
1	UC Santa Barbara	22–8	3–0 vs. Cal Poly
2	Cal Poly	22–8	0–3 vs. UC Santa Barbara
3	UC San Diego	18–12	
4	Hawai'i	16–14	
5	Cal State Fullerton	15–15	
DNQ	UC Irvine	14–16	3–0 vs. UC Davis
DNQ	UC Davis	14–16	0–3 vs. UC Irvine
DNQ	Cal State Northridge	12–18	
DNQ	Cal State Bakersfield	11–19	2–1 vs. Long Beach State
DNQ	Long Beach State	11–19	1–2 vs. Cal State Bakersfield
DNQ	UC Riverside	10–20	

== Bracket ==
Round 1
4	Hawai'i	1
5	Cal State Fullerton	5

Round 2
1	UC Santa Barbara	7
5	Cal State Fullerton	4
2	Cal Poly	1
3	UC San Diego	0
Lower round 2
5	Cal State Fullerton	1
3	UC San Diego	5

Upper final
1	UC Santa Barbara	2
2	Cal Poly	4
Lower final
3	UC San Diego	7
1	UC Santa Barbara	0

Finals
2	Cal Poly	2	4
3	UC San Diego	12^{(8)}	3

== Schedule ==
Game	Time	TV	Matchup^{#}	Score	Notes	Reference
Wednesday, May 20
1	6:00 pm	ESPN+	No. 4 Hawai'i vs. No. 5 Cal State Fullerton	1–5	Hawai'i eliminated	
Thursday, May 21
2	1:00 pm	ESPN+	No. 5 Cal State Fullerton vs. No. 1 UC Santa Barbara	4–7		
3	6:00 pm	ESPN+	No. 3 UC San Diego vs. No. 2 Cal Poly	0–1		
Friday, May 22
4	1:00 pm	ESPN+	No. 2 Cal Poly vs. No. 1 UC Santa Barbara	4–2		
5	6:00 pm	ESPN+	No. 5 Cal State Fullerton vs. No. 3 UC San Diego	1–5	Cal State Fullerton eliminated	
Saturday, May 23
6	1:00 pm	ESPN+	No. 1 UC Santa Barbara vs. No. 3 UC San Diego	0–7	UC Santa Barbara eliminated	
7	6:00 pm	ESPN+	No. 2 Cal Poly vs. No. 3 UC San Diego	2–12		
Sunday, May 24
8	12:00 pm	ESPN+	No. 2 Cal Poly vs. No. 3 UC San Diego	4–3	UC San Diego eliminated	

== All-Tournament Team ==
The following players were members of the Big West Conference All-Tournament Team. The player in bold won the MVP.

Position	Player	School
P	Jackson Flora	UC Santa Barbara
P	Isaiah Magdaleno	Hawai'i
P	Griffin Naess	Cal Poly
P	Mikiah Negrete	Cal State Fullerton
P	Cordon Pettey	Cal Poly
P	Nathan Ries	UC San Diego
CL	**Nick Bonn**	Cal Poly
C	Nate Vargas	UC Santa Barbara
1B	Gabe Camacho	UC San Diego
2B/RF	Nick Miller	Cal State Fullerton
LF	Alex Leopard	UC San Diego
DH	Cam Hoiland	Cal Poly
