= 2026 Cal Poly Mustangs baseball team =

American college baseball season

2026 Cal Poly Mustangs baseball

Big West regular season co-champions and tournament champions Los Angeles Regional Champions

Morgantown Super Regional, 0–2
- Conference: Big West Conference

Ranking
- Coaches: No. 23
- D1Baseball.com: No. 19
- Record: 39–24 (22–8 Big West)
- Head coach: Larry Lee (24th season)
- Assistant coaches: Jason Gill (3rd season); Logan Denholm (4th season)
- Pitching coach: Seth Moir (4th season)
- Home stadium: Baggett Stadium

2026 Big West Conference baseball standings
	Conf.				Overall
Team	W		L	PCT	W		L	PCT
UC Santa Barbara ‍†‍‍^{y}	22	–	8	.733	40	–	20	.667
No. 19 Cal Poly ‍‍‡‍^{y}	22	–	8	.733	39	–	24	.619
UC San Diego ‍‍‍	18	–	12	.600	27	–	28	.491
Hawai'i ‍‍‍	16	–	14	.533	27	–	23	.540
Cal State Fullerton ‍‍‍	15	–	15	.500	24	–	32	.429
UC Irvine ‍‍‍	14	–	16	.467	25	–	27	.481
UC Davis ‍‍‍	14	–	16	.467	26	–	28	.481
Cal State Northridge ‍‍‍	12	–	18	.400	25	–	28	.472
Cal State Bakersfield ‍‍‍	11	–	19	.367	21	–	32	.396
Long Beach State ‍‍‍	11	–	19	.367	17	–	35	.327
UC Riverside ‍‍‍	10	–	20	.333	15	–	37	.288
† – Conference champion ‡ – Tournament champion y – Invited to the NCAA tournament As of June 6, 2026; Rankings from D1Baseball

The 2026 Cal Poly Mustangs baseball team is the team that represent the California Polytechnic State University, San Luis Obispo during the 2026 NCAA Division I baseball season. The Mustangs are members of the Big West Conference and play their home games at Baggett Stadium. They are led by head coach Larry Lee, in his twenty-fourth season as manager. The top five teams in the Big West Conference will play in the conference's postseason tournament, with the winner receiving the automatic bid to the 2026 NCAA tournament. Cal Poly made the conference tournament as the two seed, and ended up winning, falling to UC San Diego once in the final before winning 4–3 in the winner-take-all. They received the conference's automatic bid to the NCAA tournament, and will play in the Los Angeles Regional against Virginia Tech in the opening round. The Mustangs won that game 6–2, and went on to play Saint Mary's in their next regional game. In that game they won 14–1. The Mustangs advanced to the Super Regional for the first time in program history by beating Saint Mary's for the second time, 5–2. There, they lost to West Virginia twice: once 2–12, and the other 1–17.

== Previous Season ==
Last season, Cal Poly finished with a 43–19 record, going 23–7 in the Big West, and finishing second in the conference. They fell in the semifinals to UC Irvine, before winning three straight to win the tournament. They received the conference's automatic bid to the 2025 NCAA Division I Baseball Tournament in the Oregon regional, falling to Arizona in the regional final.

== Preseason ==
=== Big West Preseason Poll & Team ===
The Big West Coaches' Poll and Team was released on February 6, 2026. Cal Poly was predicted to finish second in the conference, and also had two players make the preseason team.

Coaches' Poll
Pos.	Team	Points
1	UC Santa Barbara	95 (5)
2	Cal Poly	89 (5)
3	UC Irvine	86 (1)
T-4	Cal State Fullerton	67
T-4	Hawai'i	67
6	UC San Diego	60
7	Long Beach State	41
8	UC Davis	40
9	CSUN	25
10	Cal State Bakersfield	22
11	UC Riverside	13

Preseason Coaches' Team
Player	No.	Position	Class
Alejandro Garza	5	3B	Junior
Griffin Naess	27	RHP	Junior

== Personnel ==
=== Starters ===
Lineup
Pos.	No.	Player.	Year
C	12	Ryan Tayman	Junior
1B	17	Thomas Braxton	Junior
2B	2	Jake Downing	Sophomore
3B	5	Alejandro Garza	Junior
SS	7	Nate Castellon	Sophomore
LF	6	Dante Vachini	Sophomore
CF	1	Casey Murray Jr.	Graduate
RF	4	Dylan Kordic	Graduate
DH	15	Cam Hoiland	Graduate

Weekend pitching rotation
Day	No.	Player.	Year
Friday	27	Griffin Naess	Junior
Saturday	45	Josh Volmerding	Junior
Sunday	36	Laif Palmer	Junior

=== Roster ===
2026 Cal Poly Mustangs baseball team
Players
Coaches

#	Pos.	Name	B/T	Height	Weight	Year	Home town
1	OF	Casey Murray Jr.	/	6 ft 2 in (1.88 m)	190 lb (86 kg)	Gr	Perris, CA
2	INF	Jake Downing	/	5 ft 10 in (1.78 m)	170 lb (77 kg)	So	Redwood City, CA
4	OF	Dylan Kordic	/	6 ft 3 in (1.91 m)	200 lb (91 kg)	Gr	San Pedro, CA
5	INF	Alejandro Garza	/	5 ft 9 in (1.75 m)	165 lb (75 kg)	Jr	Bakersfield, CA
6	OF	Dante Vachini	/	6 ft 3 in (1.91 m)	200 lb (91 kg)	So	Cotati, CA
7	INF	Nate Castellon	/	5 ft 9 in (1.75 m)	180 lb (82 kg)	So	Woodland Hills, CA
10	INF	Antonio Castro	/	6 ft 1 in (1.85 m)	190 lb (86 kg)	Fr	Concord, CA
11	LHP	Brady Estes	/	6 ft 3 in (1.91 m)	205 lb (93 kg)	Fr	Rocklin, CA
12	INF	Gavin Spiridonoff	/	6 ft 0 in (1.83 m)	185 lb (84 kg)	Fr	Aliso Viejo, CA
14	INF	Cade Falskin	/	5 ft 9 in (1.75 m)	165 lb (75 kg)	RS Fr	Newbury Park, CA
15	UTL	Cam Hoiland	/	6 ft 2 in (1.88 m)	200 lb (91 kg)	Gr	Renton, WA
16	C	Ryan Tayman	/	6 ft 2 in (1.88 m)	210 lb (95 kg)	Jr	Grover Beach, CA
17	INF	Braxton Thomas	/	6 ft 2 in (1.88 m)	220 lb (100 kg)	Jr	Patterson, CA
19	LHP	Chris Downs	/	6 ft 7 in (2.01 m)	215 lb (98 kg)	Jr	Santa Clarita, CA
20	OF	Xander McLaurin	/	6 ft 0 in (1.83 m)	190 lb (86 kg)	Sr	Long Beach, CA
23	OF	Devin Porch	/	5 ft 11 in (1.8 m)	190 lb (86 kg)	Fr	Lakewood, CA
24	RHP	Eric Kvidahl	/	6 ft 5 in (1.96 m)	205 lb (93 kg)	Sr	Napa, CA
25	LHP	Josh Morano	/	6 ft 4 in (1.93 m)	215 lb (98 kg)	Jr	Livermore, CA
27	RHP	Griffin Naess	/	6 ft 6 in (1.98 m)	185 lb (84 kg)	Jr	Laguna Beach, CA
28	RHP	Nick Bonn	/	6 ft 1 in (1.85 m)	160 lb (73 kg)	Sr	Laguna Beach, CA
30	C	Coco Vonderhaar	/	5 ft 11 in (1.8 m)	185 lb (84 kg)	Fr	Palo Alto, CA
32	RHP	Carson Turnquist	/	6 ft 5 in (1.96 m)	235 lb (107 kg)	RS Jr	Paso Robles, CA
33	OF	Rowan Meli	/	6 ft 3 in (1.91 m)	195 lb (88 kg)	Fr	Thousand Oaks, CA
34	C	Josh Mendoza	/	5 ft 9 in (1.75 m)	155 lb (70 kg)	Fr	Rocklin, CA
35	RHP	Daniel Camou	/	5 ft 11 in (1.8 m)	195 lb (88 kg)	Fr	San Dimas, CA
36	RHP	Laif Palmer	/	6 ft 6 in (1.98 m)	205 lb (93 kg)	Jr	Golden, CO
37	RHP	Cordon Pettey	/	6 ft 2 in (1.88 m)	215 lb (98 kg)	Fr	Rocklin, CA
38	RHP	Ethan Marmie	/	6 ft 7 in (2.01 m)	225 lb (102 kg)	Jr	Morgan Hill, CA
39	INF	Vinnie Van der Wel	/	6 ft 1 in (1.85 m)	205 lb (93 kg)	So	Woodland Hills, CA
41	RHP	Sean McGrath	/	6 ft 1 in (1.85 m)	200 lb (91 kg)	Fr	Novato, CA
43	LHP	Henry Souza	/	5 ft 10 in (1.78 m)	175 lb (79 kg)	RS Fr	Lafayette, CA
45	LHP	Josh Volmerding	/	6 ft 4 in (1.93 m)	210 lb (95 kg)	Jr	Santa Rosa, CA
46	LHP	Caden Pearlman	/	6 ft 3 in (1.91 m)	190 lb (86 kg)	RS So	San Diego, CA
47	LHP	Luke Kalfsbeek	/	6 ft 3 in (1.91 m)	190 lb (86 kg)	So	Arbuckle, CA
48	RHP	Arlo Pendleton	/	6 ft 5 in (1.96 m)	205 lb (93 kg)	Fr	Petaluma, CA
49	RHP	Troy Cooper	/	6 ft 3 in (1.91 m)	200 lb (91 kg)	So	Stevenson Ranch, CA

Head coach

Larry Lee

Assistant coach(es)

Logan Denholm
Jason Gill
Seth Moir

Legend

- (C) Team captain
- (S) Suspended
- (I) Ineligible
- Injured
- Current redshirt

Roster
Last update: May 28, 2026

== Schedule ==
Legend
	Mustangs win
	Mustangs loss
	Postponement
**Bold**	Mustangs team member

2026 Cal Poly Mustangs baseball game log (39–24)
Regular Season (33–21)

February (4–6)
Date	Time (PST)	TV	Opponent	Rank	Stadium	Score	Win	Loss	Save	Attendance	Overall	BWC
February 13	2:00 p.m.	—	at Campbell*	—	Jim Perry Stadium; Buies Creek, North Carolina	2–5	Grubich (1–0)	**Naess** (0–1)	Music (1)	814	0–1	—
February 14 (DH)	10:00 a.m.	—	at Campbell*	—	Jim Perry Stadium	16–5	**Morano** (1–0)	Rossow (0–1)	**Bonn (1)**	712	1–1	—
February 14 (DH) (Note: While initially scheduled for February 15 at 1:00 p.m., the game was moved to February 14 as a doubleheader due to impending weather.)	2:00 p.m.	—	at Campbell*	—	Jim Perry Stadium	4–3	**Palmer (1–0)**	Clark (0–1)	**Pettey (1)**	678	2–1	—
February 17	1:05 p.m.	ESPN+	at San Jose State*	—	Excite Ballpark; San Jose, California	**Canceled due to inclement weather**						
February 20	6:05 p.m.	ESPN+	Washington State*	—	Baggett Stadium; San Luis Obispo, California	9–0	**Naess (1–1)**	Meyers (1–1)	None	1,712	3–1	—
February 21	3:05 p.m.	ESPN+	Washington State*	—	Baggett Stadium	3–2 (10)	**Pettey (1–0)**	Rienguette (0–1)	None	1,619	4–1	—
February 22	1:05 p.m.	ESPN+	Washington State*	—	Baggett Stadium	3–8	Smith (1–1)	**Palmer (1–1)**	None	1,644	4–2	—
February 23	5:05 p.m.	ESPN+	Washington State*	—	Baggett Stadium	4–5	Stowe (1–0)	**Bonn (0–1)**	Rienguette (1)	1,227	4–3	—
February 26	6:05 p.m.	ESPN+	No. 25 USC*	—	Baggett Stadium	0–4	Herrell (1–0)	**Pettey (1–1)**	None	1,587	4–4	—
February 27	6:05 p.m.	ESPN+	No. 25 USC*	—	Baggett Stadium	0–6 (11)	Matson (1–0)	**McGrath (0–1)**	None	2,508	4–5	—
February 28	3:05 p.m.	ESPN+	No. 25 USC*	—	Baggett Stadium	2–16	Govel (3–0)	**Palmer (1–2)**	None	1,612	4–6	—

March (13–4)
Date	Time (PST)	TV	Opponent	Rank	Stadium	Score	Win	Loss	Save	Attendance	Overall	BWC
March 1	1:05 p.m.	ESPN+	No. 25 USC*	—	Baggett Stadium; San Luis Obispo, California	6–8 (11)	Lauridsen (1–0)	**McGrath (0–2)**	None	2,126	4–7	—
March 3	5:00 p.m.	ESPN+	Pepperdine*	—	Baggett Stadium	12–2	**Morano (2–0)**	Peterson (0–1)	None	1,052	5–7	—
March 6	8:35 p.m.	—	at Hawai'i	—	Les Murakami Stadium; Honolulu, Hawaii	6–2	**Naess (2–1)**	Magdaleno (1–1)	**Bonn (2)**	4,196	6–7	1–0
March 7	8:35 p.m.	—	at Hawai'i	—	Les Murakami Stadium	10–7 (11)	**Estes (1–0)**	Akire II (1–1)	None	4,379	7–7	2–0
March 8	4:05 p.m.	ESPN+	at Hawai'i	—	Les Murakami Stadium	7–3	**Turnquist (1–0)**	Martin-Grudzielanek (0–3)	**Bonn (3)**	4,155	8–7	3–0
March 10	5:05 p.m.	ESPN+	Fresno State*	—	Baggett Stadium	13–3	**Morano (3–0)**	Cuellar (1–1)	None	1,557	9–7	—
March 13	6:05 p.m.	—	Cal State Bakersfield	—	Baggett Stadium	8–4	**Naess (3–1)**	King (0–2)	**Bonn (4)**	1,382	10–7	4–0
March 14	3:05 p.m.	—	Cal State Bakersfield	—	Baggett Stadium	6–2	**Pettey (2–1)**	Mcalinden (1–4)	**Estes (1)**	1,411	11–7	5–0
March 15	1:05 p.m.	—	Cal State Bakersfield	—	Baggett Stadium	6–3	**Turnquist (2–0)**	O'Regan (0–1)	**Bonn (5)**	1,604	12–7	6–0
March 20	3:00 p.m.	ESPN+	UC Davis	—	Baggett Stadium	12–11	**Downs (1–0)**	Anzai (2–1)	Bonn (6)	1,584	13–7	7–0
March 21	1:00 p.m.	ESPN+	UC Davis	—	Baggett Stadium	5–4	**Estes (2–0)**	Valdez (1–3)	Bonn (7)	1,637	14–7	8–0
March 22	1:00 p.m.	ESPN+	UC Davis	—	Baggett Stadium	2–8	Storjohann (2–0)	**Morano (3–1)**	None	1,277	14–8	8–1
March 24	6:00 p.m.	ESPN+	at LMU*	—	George C. Page Stadium; Los Angeles, California	7–8	Fried (1–2)	**Bonn** (0–2)	None	279	14–9	—
March 27	2:00 p.m.	ESPN+	at UC Riverside	—	Riverside Sports Complex; Riverside, California	22–4	**Naess (4–1)**	Becker (0–1)	None	235	15–9	9–1
March 28	1:00 p.m.	ESPN+	at UC Riverside	—	Riverside Sports Complex	4–10	O'Brien (2–3)	**Pettey (2–2)**	None	208	15–10	9–2
March 29	1:00 p.m.	ESPN+	at UC Riverside	—	Riverside Sports Complex	12–8	**Estes (3–0)**	Martinez (1–4)	**Bonn (8)**	157	16–10	10–2
March 31	5:05 p.m.	—	at Fresno State	—	Pete Beiden Field; Fresno, California	10–4	**Downs (2–0)**	Rico (0–1)	None	1,473	17–10	—

April (8–8)
Date	Time (PST)	TV	Opponent	Rank	Stadium	Score	Win	Loss	Save	Attendance	Overall	BWC
April 2	6:05 p.m.	ESPN+	UC Santa Barbara	—	Baggett Stadium; San Luis Obispo, California	6–0	Flora (6–0)	**Naess (4–2)**	None	2,287	17–11	10–3
April 3	6:05 p.m.	ESPN+	UC Santa Barbara	—	Baggett Stadium	2–4	Tryba (2–2)	**Downs (2–1)**	None	2,814	17–12	10–4
April 4	1:05 p.m.	ESPN+	UC Santa Barbara	—	Baggett Stadium	4–12	Montgomery (5–2)	**Turnquist (2–1)**	None	2,663	17–13	10–5
April 7	5:05 p.m.	ESPN+	San Jose State*	—	Baggett Stadium	11–4	**McGrath (1–2)**	Albanese (1–1)	None	1,748	18–13	—
April 10	5:05 p.m.	KRCW-TV	at No. 7 Oregon State*	—	Goss Stadium; Corvallis, Oregon	3–6	Morris (2–0)	**Estes (3–1)**	Roblez (11)	3,947	18–14	—
April 11	2:05 p.m.	KOIN	at No. 7 Oregon State	—	Goss Stadium	6–11	Kleinschmit (6–2)	**Turnquist (2–2)**	None	3,952	18–15	—
April 12	1:05 p.m.	KRCW-TV	at No. 7 Oregon State	—	Goss Stadium	2–3	Roblez (1–0)	**Bonn (0–3)**	None	3,832	18–16	—
April 14	5:05 p.m.	ESPN+	Pepperdine*	—	Baggett Stadium	7–3	**McGrath (2–2)**	Maya (0–1)	None	1,203	19–16	—
April 17	6:00 p.m.	ESPN+	at UC San Diego	—	Triton Ballpark; La Jolla, California	11–3	**Naess (5–2)**	Murdock (4–2)	None	612	20–16	11–5
April 18	2:00 p.m.	ESPN+	at UC San Diego	—	Triton Ballpark	5–3	**Turnquist (3–2)**	Rector (0–2)	**Bonn (9)**	454	21–16	12–5
April 19	1:00 p.m.	ESPN+	at UC San Diego	—	Triton Ballpark	15–16	King (3–0)	**Bonn (1–3)**	None	539	21–17	12–6
April 21	3:00 p.m.	ESPN+	at Pepperdine	—	Eddy D. Field Stadium; Malibu, California	3–6	Croghan (2–0)	**McGrath (2–3)**	Wechsberg (6)	320	21–18	—
April 24	6:05 p.m.	ESPN+	CSUN	—	Baggett Stadium	8–5	**Estes (4–1)**	Christopher (3–3)	None	1,727	22–18	13–6
April 25	12:05 p.m.	ESPN+	CSUN	—	Baggett Stadium	5–4	**Turnquist (4–2)**	Oughton (4–1)	**Bonn (10)**	1,502	23–18	14–6
April 26	1:05 p.m.	ESPN+	CSUN	—	Baggett Stadium	5–2	**Pettey (3–2)**	Miller (0–1)	**Bonn (11)**	2,384	24–18	15–6
April 28	4:05 p.m.	ESPN+	Santa Clara*	—	Baggett Stadium	7–0	**McGrath (3–3)**	Habermann (0–2)	None	1,352	25–18	—

May (8–3)
Date	Time (PST)	TV	Opponent	Rank	Stadium	Score	Win	Loss	Save	Attendance	Overall	BWC
May 1	6:00 p.m.	ESPN+	at UC Irvine	—	Cicerone Field; Irvine, California	4–11	Hansen (5–4)	**Naess (5–3)**	None	1,000	25–19	15–7
May 2	1:00 p.m.	ESPN+	at UC Irvine	—	Cicerone Field	11–2	**Turnquist (5–2)**	Wall (3–4)	**Downs (1)**	732	26–19	16–7
May 3	1:00 p.m.	ESPN+	at UC Irvine	—	Cicerone Field	8–6	**Bonn (1–4)**	Suarez (2–2)	None	951	27–19	17–7
May 5	4:05 p.m.	ESPN+	at Santa Clara*	—	Stephen Schott Stadium; Santa Clara, California	4–11	Dotoli (2–0)	McGrath (3–4)	None	503	27–20	—
May 8	6:30 p.m.	ESPN+	at Cal State Fullerton*	—	Goodwin Field; Fullerton, California	3–4	Negrete (8–3)	**Naess (5–4)**	Wright (5)	948	27–21	17–8
May 9	5:00 p.m.	ESPN+	at Cal State Fullerton	—	Goodwin Field	7–6	**Turnquist (6–2)**	Mahoney (2–3)	**Bonn (12)**	1,185	28–21	18–8
May 10	1:00 p.m.	ESPN+	at Cal State Fullerton	—	Goodwin Field	6–2	**Downs (3–1)**	Smith (3–6)	**Estes (2)**	695	29–21	19–8
May 11	5:05 p.m.	—	at Fresno State*	—	Pete Beiden Field; Fresno, California	15–10	**Cooper (1–0)**	Rodriguez (1–3)	**McGrath (1)**	1,263	30–21	—
May 14	6:05 p.m.	ESPN+	Long Beach State	—	Baggett Stadium; San Luis Obispo, California	11–3	**Naess (6–4)**	Kahalekai (0–5)	None	1,738	31–21	20–8
May 15	6:05 p.m.	ESPN+	Long Beach State	—	Baggett Stadium	6–2	**Turnquist (7–2)**	Howe (5–4)	**Downs (2)**	2,923	32–21	21–8
May 16	1:05 p.m.	ESPN+	Long Beach State	—	Baggett Stadium	8–3	**Cooper (2–0)**	Gerfers (3–8)	None	2,087	33–21	22–8

Postseason (6–3)

Big West tournament (3–1)
Date	Time (PST)	TV	Opponent	Rank	Stadium	Score	Win	Loss	Save	Attendance	Overall	BWCT Record
May 21	6:00 p.m.	ESPN+	UC San Diego (3)	(2)	Cicerone Field; Irvine, California	1–0	**Naess (7–4)**	Murdock (4–3)	**Bonn (13)**	709	34–21	1–0
May 22	1:00 p.m.	ESPN+	UC Santa Barbara (1)	(2)	Cicerone Field	4–2	**Turnquist (8–2)**	Hoover (1–1)	**Bonn (14)**	698	35–21	2–0
May 23	6:00 p.m.	ESPN+	UC San Diego (3)	(2)	Cicerone Field	2–12 (8)	Bowker (5–1)	**Volmerding (0–1)**	Henson (3)	928	35–22	2–1
May 24	12:00 p.m.	ESPN+	UC San Diego (3)	(2)	Cicerone Field	4–3	**Pettey (4–2)**	Rector (0–4)	**Bonn (15)**	733	36–22	3–1

Los Angeles Regional (3–0)
Date	Time (PST)	TV	Opponent	Rank	Stadium	Score	Win	Loss	Save	Attendance	Overall	Los Angeles Regional Record
May 29	5:00 p.m.	ESPN+	vs Virginia Tech (2)	(3)	Jackie Robinson Stadium; Los Angeles, California	6–2	**Naess (8–4)**	Eisenreich (2–3)	**Bonn (16)**	1,680	37–22	1–0
May 30	6:00 p.m.	ESPN+	vs Saint Mary's (4)	(3)	Jackie Robinson Stadium	14–1	**Turnquist (9–2)**	Sarantos (4–3)	None	1,680	38–22	2–0
May 31	6:00 p.m.	ESPN+	vs Saint Mary's (4)	(3)	Jackie Robinson Stadium	5–2	**Volmerding (1–1)**	Roberts (2–2)	**Bonn (17)**	1,680	39–22	3–0

Morgantown Super Regional (0–2)
Date	Time (PST)	TV	Opponent	Rank	Stadium	Score	Win	Loss	Save	Attendance	Overall	Morgantown Super Regional Record
June 5	9:00 a.m.	ESPN2	No. 9 West Virginia (16)	—	Kendrick Family Ballpark; Morgantown, West Virginia	2–12	Cole (10–1)	**Naess (8–5)**	None	4,564	39–23	0–1
June 6	9:00 a.m.	ESPN2	No. 9 West Virginia (16)	—	Kendrick Family Ballpark	1–17	Yehl (9–2)	**Turnquist (9–3)**	None	4,675	39–24	0–2

*Non-conference game. ^{#}Rankings from D1Baseball. (#) Tournament seedings in parentheses.
All times are in Pacific.

== Rankings ==
Ranking movements Legend: ██ Increase in ranking ██ Decrease in ranking — = Not ranked RV = Received votes
	Week																	
Poll	Pre	1	2	3	4	5	6	7	8	9	10	11	12	13	14	15	16	Final
Coaches'	—	—*	RV	—	—	RV	—	—	—	—	—	—	—	—	—	—	—*	23
Baseball America	—	—	—	—	—	—	—	—	—	—	—	—	—	—	—	—*	—*	23
NCBWA†	RV	RV	—	—	—	—	RV	—	—	—	—	RV	—	RV	RV	RV*	18	19
D1Baseball	—	—	—	—	—	—	—	—	—	—	—	—	—	—	—	—	—*	19
Perfect Game	—	—	—	—	—	—	—	—	—	—	—	—	—	—	—	—*	—*	14

† NCBWA ranks 30 teams in their preseason poll, but only ranks 25 teams weekly during the season.
* A new poll was not released for this week, so for comparison purposes, the previous week's ranking is inserted in this week's slot.
