= Matt Vaughn =

American baseball coach and pitcher

Biographical details
- Education: UC Davis (1992)

Playing career
- 1989–1992: UC Davis
- Position: Pitcher

Coaching career (HC unless noted)
- 1993–2011: UC Davis (P)
- 2012–2021: UC Davis

Head coaching record
- Overall: 193–306–1

Matt Vaughn is an American baseball coach and former pitcher. He played college baseball at UC Davis for head coach Phil Swimley. He then served as head coach of the UC Davis Aggies (2012–2021).

== Playing career ==
Vaughn pitched for UC Davis for four years, appearing in 37 games. He was honorable mention all-conference in his senior season, winning his final three starts as an Aggie.

== Coaching career ==
UC Davis hired Vaughn as a pitching coach for the first season after his graduation. He worked with a pair of Division II College World Series teams in 1995 and 2003, and assisted in the first Aggie team to reach the Division I NCAA Tournament in 2008. He has coached 36 players who have signed professional contracts and fifteen of his pitchers drafted in the Major League Baseball draft. After being passed over in favor of Rex Peters for the open head coaching position in 2002, Vaughn nearly left the school, but elected instead to remain. He was elevated to the head coaching position in August 2011. On November 12, 2021, Vaughn resigned his position with the Aggies following the conclusion of the University's investigation into hazing allegations.

== Head coaching record ==
Below is a table of Vaughn's yearly records as an NCAA head baseball coach.

Record table
| Season | Team | Overall | Conference | Standing | Postseason |
|---|---|---|---|---|---|
UC Davis Aggies (Big West Conference) (2012–2021)
| 2012 | UC Davis | 27–30 | 12–12 | 5th | |
| 2013 | UC Davis | 19–37 | 5–22 | 10th | |
| 2014 | UC Davis | 23–31 | 7–17 | 7th | |
| 2015 | UC Davis | 30–26–1 | 9–15 | T–7th | |
| 2016 | UC Davis | 17–36 | 5–19 | 9th | |
| 2017 | UC Davis | 21–30 | 10–14 | T–5th | |
| 2018 | UC Davis | 18–35 | 9–15 | 8th | |
| 2019 | UC Davis | 19–31 | 9–15 | T–5th | |
| 2020 | UC Davis | 9–7 | 0–0 | | Season canceled due to COVID-19 |
| 2021 | UC Davis | 14–43 | 8–32 | 11th | |
| UC Davis: | | 193–304–1 | 74–161 | | |
| Total: | | 193–304–1 | | | |
