= Tommy Nicholson =

American baseball coach

Current position
- Title: Head coach
- Team: UC Davis
- Conference: Mountain West
- Record: 105–155

Biographical details
- Born: August 23, 1979 (age 47); Santa Ana, California, U.S.

Playing career
- 1998–2000: Texas
- 2000: Burlington Bees
- 2001–2004: Winston-Salem Warthogs
- 2003–2004: Charlotte Knights
- 2003–2005: Birmingham Barons
- 2005: Tulsa Drillers
- 2005: Colorado Springs Sky Sox
- Position: Infielder

Coaching career (HC unless noted)
- 2009–2010: Texas (VA)
- 2011–2012: Sacramento State (IN/H)
- 2013–2016: Texas (IN/H)
- 2017: Sacramento State (IN/H)
- 2018–2021: Stanford (IN/H)
- 2022–present: UC Davis

Head coaching record
- Overall: 105–155
- Tournaments: NCAA: 0–0

Thomas Blair Nicholson (born August 23, 1979) is a baseball coach and former infielder, who is the baseball head coach of the UC Davis Aggies. He played college baseball at Texas from 1998 to 2000 for head coach Augie Garrido.

== Playing career ==
Nicholson went to Esperanza High School in Anaheim, California, where he played shortstop. As a senior he hit .456 with 7 homeruns and 46 RBI.

Nicholson attended the University of Texas in Austin, Texas. He was a member of the Texas Longhorns baseball team that played in the 2000 College World Series.

He would be selected in the 11th round of the 2000 Major League Baseball draft by the Chicago White Sox. Nicholson would spend 6 years in Minor League Baseball for the White Sox and Colorado Rockies's organizations.

== Coaching career ==
Nicholson joined the coaching staff of the Longhorns in 2009 as a volunteer assistant. He returned in the same role in 2010. For the 2011 and 2012 seasons, Nicholson was named the hitting and infield coach at Sacramento State where he helped tutor Rhys Hoskins. In the summer of 2012, Nicholson returned to Austin, to join Garrido's coaching staff as hitting and infield coach. Nicholson returned to Sacramento State in 2017, before joining the coaching staff of the Stanford Cardinal in 2018.

On December 13, 2021, Nicholson was named the head baseball coach of the UC Davis Aggies.

== Head coaching record ==
Record table
Season	Team	Overall	Conference	Standing	Postseason
UC Davis Aggies (Big West Conference) (2022–present)
2022	UC Davis	6–35	5–25	10th	
2023	UC Davis	17–37	7–23	10th	
2024	UC Davis	29–27	13–17	7th	
2025	UC Davis	27–28	13–17	8th	
2026	UC Davis	26–28	14–16	T-6th	
UC Davis:		105–155	52–98		
Total:		105–155			
National champion Postseason invitational champion Conference regular season champion Conference regular season and conference tournament champion Division regular season champion Division regular season and conference tournament champion Conference tournament champion
