= Logan Reddemann =

American baseball player (born 2005)

Colorado Rockies
- Pitcher
- Born: April 8, 2005 (age 21); Lancaster, California, U.S.
- Bats: Right Throws: Right
- Stats at Baseball Reference

Logan John Reddemann (born April 8, 2005) is an American professional baseball pitcher in the Colorado Rockies organization. He played college baseball for the San Diego Toreros and UCLA Bruins.

== Amateur career ==
Reddemann attended Quartz Hill High School in Quartz Hill, California. During his senior year, he threw a perfect game with 11 strikeouts in a game against Palmdale High School. Following his high school career, Reddemann committed to play college baseball at the University of San Diego.

As a freshman, Reddemann totaled a 7–4 win–loss record with a 4.01 earned run average (ERA) and 66 strikeouts in 15 appearances. He returned to San Diego as a sophomore, recording a 2.29 ERA with 53 strikeouts across 55 innings pitched in 11 appearances. In 2025, he played collegiate summer baseball with the Orleans Firebirds of the Cape Cod Baseball League. Reddemann transferred to the University of California, Los Angeles prior to the start of the 2026 season. He emerged as the ace of the Bruins' starting pitching staff. During a game against Rutgers, Reddemann recorded 18 strikeouts, tying the school’s single-game strikeout record. As a result of his performance, he was named the Golden Spikes Player of the Week.

== Professional career ==
Redemann was drafted in the second round of the 2026 MLB draft by the Colorado Rockies and signed for $2,633,100.
