= Billy Gasparino =

American baseball executive (born 1976)

William Anthony "Billy" Gasparino (born November 28, 1976) is the Vice-President in charge of Amateur Scouting for the Los Angeles Dodgers of Major League Baseball and a former baseball infielder.

== Playing career ==
Gasparino attended Oklahoma State University (OSU), where he played college baseball for the Oklahoma State Cowboys baseball team as an infielder. In 1997, he played collegiate summer baseball with the Bourne Braves of the Cape Cod Baseball League. He was drafted out of OSU by the Colorado Rockies in the 17th round (520th overall) of the 1999 Major League Baseball draft. He hit .260/.373/.388 in the lone season of his minor league (MiLB) career.

== Scouting career ==
=== San Diego Padres (2012–2014) ===
In the fall of 2010, Gasparino was hired by the San Diego Padres from the Toronto Blue Jays to serve the position as the national crosschecker. Afterwards, in 2012, Gasparino was promoted out of his crosschecker position to become their director of scouting.

=== Los Angeles Dodgers ===
On November 7, 2014, Gasparino was hired by the Los Angeles Dodgers.

Under Gasparino as scouting director, the Dodgers have drafted current players such as Walker Buehler, Dustin May, Will Smith, Tony Gonsolin, Edwin Rios, Gavin Lux, Matt Beaty, and Mitchell White (Buehler and Lux being the top picks in his first two drafts).

Other draftees under Gasparino include Devin Smeltzer, Luke Raley. Andre Scrubb, A.J. Alexy, Dean Kremer, Connor Wong, Zach Pop and Rylan Bannon, all of whom were used in trades to acquire key veterans.

== Personal life ==
Gasparino is married to his wife Jenna. He has two sons; Will and Lucca. Will played college baseball for the Texas Longhorns and UCLA Bruins. Will was a top prospect for the 2023 Major League Baseball draft and the 2026 draft. Will was drafted in the 5th round (161st overall) in the 2026 draft by the Philadelphia Phillies and signed for a $430,700 signing bonus.

The Gasparino family have a longstanding friendship with the Cholowsky family.
