= Caesar Uyesaka Stadium =

Baseball stadium in Santa Barbara, California

Coordinates: 34.418609°N 119.852536°W

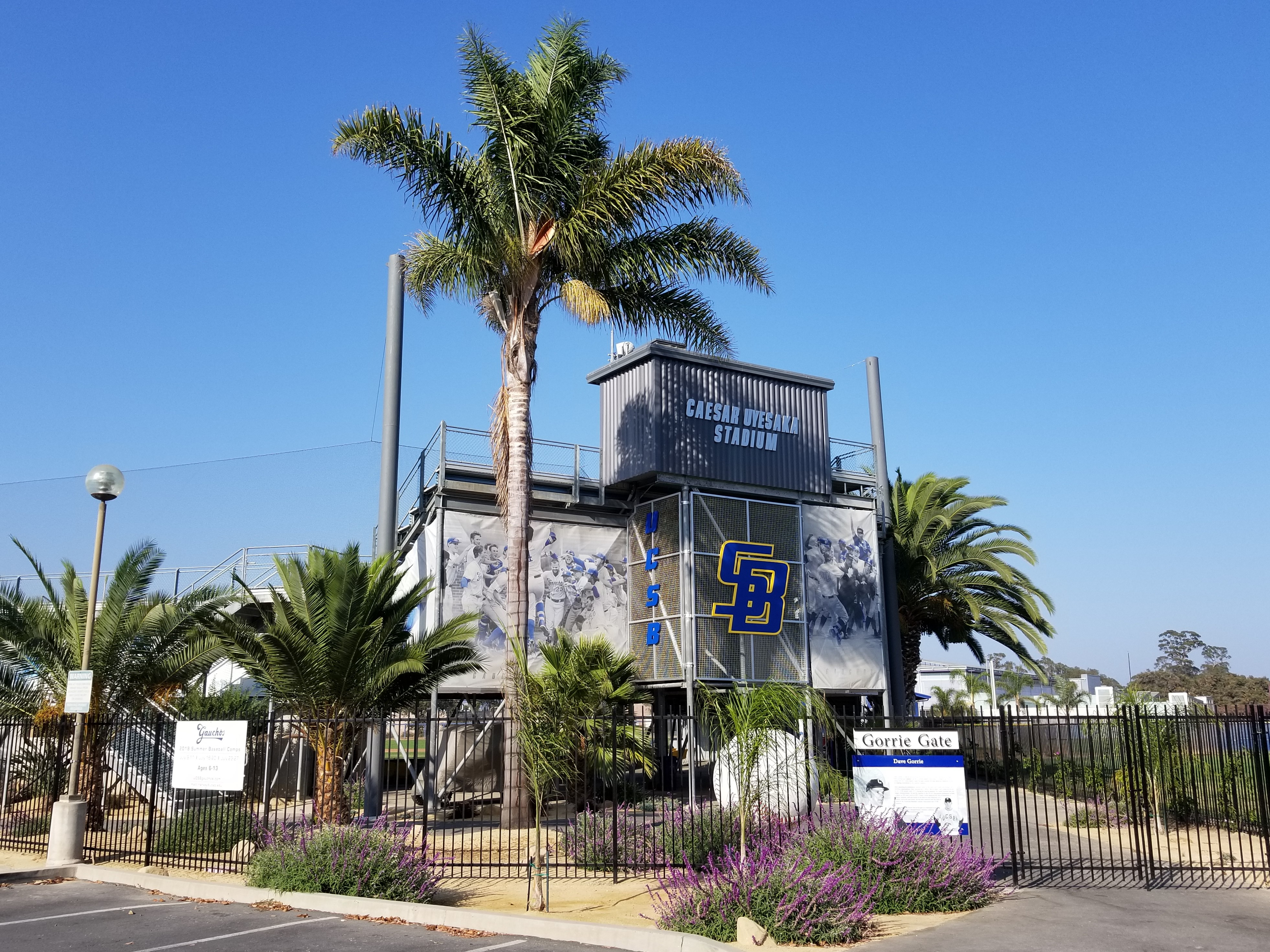
- Exterior view of the stadium in 2018
- Interactive map of Caesar Uyesaka Stadium
- Former names: Campus Diamond, Campus Stadium
- Address: Stadium Road; Santa Barbara, CA; United States
- Owner: University of California, Santa Barbara
- Capacity: 1,000
- Type: Ballpark
- Surface: Grass
- Scoreboard: Yes
- Field size: Left field line - 335 feet (102 m); Left-center field - 385 feet (117 m); Center field - 400 feet (122 m); Right-center field - 385 feet (117 m); Right field line - 335 feet (102 m)
- Current use: Baseball

Construction
- Opened: 1964; 62 years ago
- Renovated: 5 February 1994

Tenants
- UC Santa Barbara Gauchos baseball; Santa Barbara Foresters (CCL)

Website
- ucsb.edu/caesar-uyesaka-stadium

Caesar Uyesaka Stadium is a baseball stadium in Santa Barbara, California. It is the home field of the UC Santa Barbara Gauchos baseball team as well as the Santa Barbara Foresters.

== History ==
The stadium known simply as "Campus Diamond" or "Campus Stadium" opened in 1964, and underwent a major renovation and expansion after the 1993 college baseball season ended. The stadium was renamed for the late Caesar Uyesaka, a Santa Barbara resident and dedicated UCSB booster. The first game was hosted at Caesar Uyesaka Stadium on 5 February 1994 in a contest between UC Santa Barbara and the University of San Diego Toreros. UCSB won the game, 10–4.

== A unique baseball venue ==
The stadium is designed with two levels, one on top of the other, where all seating is directly behind home plate. It offers a unique view in that the seats are "field level" and under the shade of the seating deck above it. The seating does not stretch past first or third base. There is no established seating in the outfield, although occasionally students stand behind the outfield fences.

With Santa Barbara's Mediterranean climate, Caesar Uyesaka Stadium is a popular destination for students and the community alike in the spring and summer. The Santa Ynez Mountains can be seen beyond the outfield fence and southerly ocean breezes from the Pacific Ocean can be felt, despite the fact its outfield fences are farther than many major league ballparks.

== The Hammerheads ==
Under coach Al Ferrer, UCSB improved its program in the late 1970s and 1980s. Along with this improvement came larger and more enthusiastic crowds. A group of students began taking the cardboard boxes given out at the concession stands to carry food and wore them sideways on their heads. Eventually this practice spread and the student section of rowdy supporters became known as the "hammerheads", after the distinctive look of hammerhead sharks.

== Renovations ==
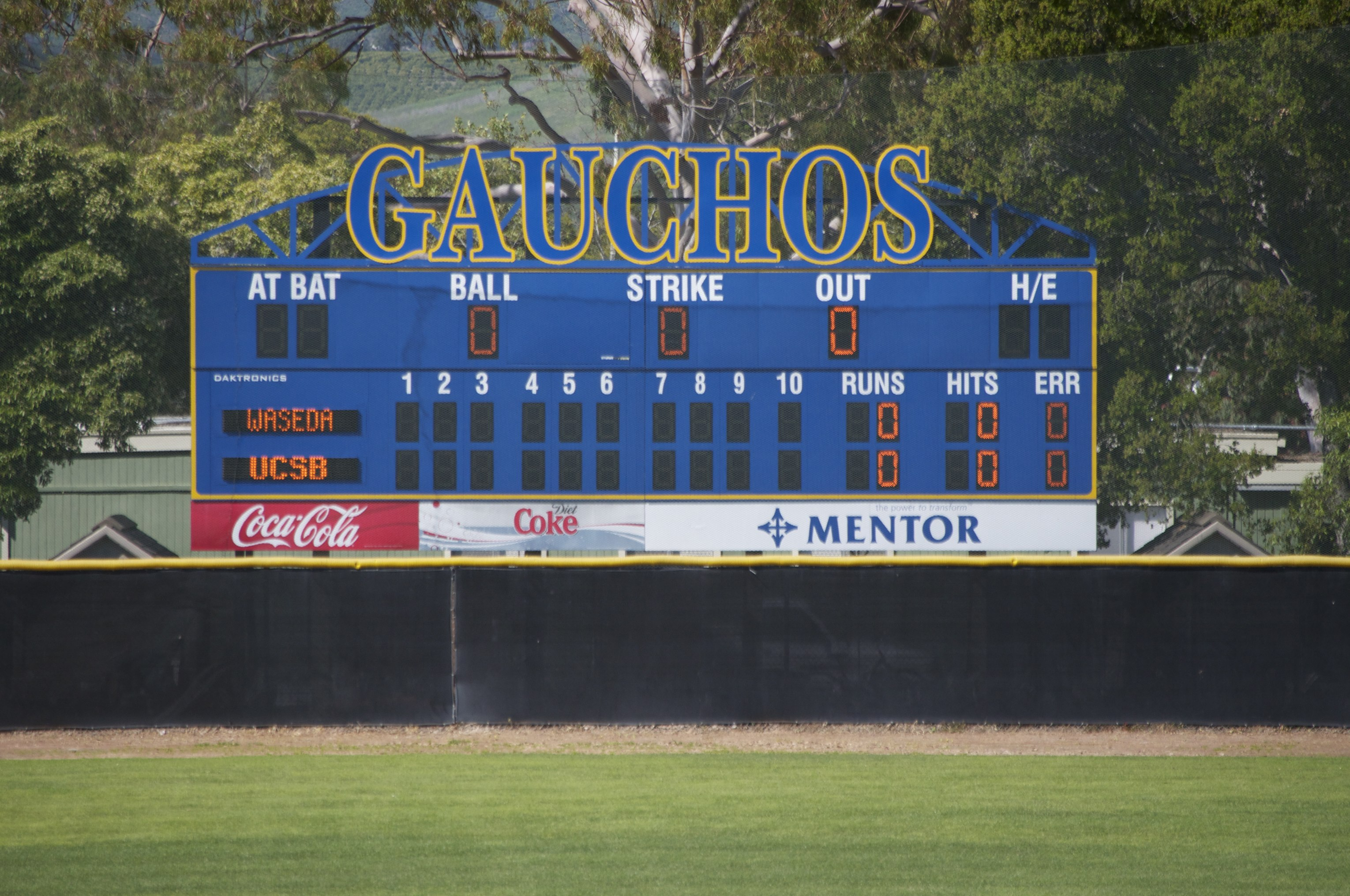
Stadium's scoreboard as seen in 2010

To accommodate the strain of hosting two baseball teams, Caesar Uyesaka Stadium has undergone many upgrades to provide an enjoyable experience to the crowds. Recent upgrades since 2006 include a 1,600-square-foot (150 m^{2}) clubhouse (including lockers and showers) and covered hitting/pitching facility.

At the time, those upgrades did not bring Caesar Uyesaka up to minimum standards to host an NCAA Division I baseball tournament regional or super regional tournament. The stadium lacked an adequate press facility and the capacity was short of what the NCAA desires for a host site. UCSB hosted a 2015 regional at the Lake Elsinore Diamond in Riverside County, a drive which often takes more than three hours and is routed through Glendale and Pasadena, among other locales. After additional upgrades to the stadium, its press facilities, and the stadium capacity, the NCAA approved Caesar Uyesaka Stadium as a regional host in 2024 for the Santa Barbara Regional. The Gauchos went 2-2, ultimately losing the regional final to Oregon.

Lights were added to the stadium prior to the 2020 season. The first night game at Caesar Uyesaka was played on 17 February 2020, with UCSB defeating the Cal Bears 17–7.

== See also ==
- List of NCAA Division I baseball venues
