= UC Davis Aggies baseball =

Division I baseball team

- 2026 UC Davis Aggies baseball team
- Founded: 1938; 88 years ago
- University: University of California, Davis
- Head coach: Tommy Nicholson (5th season)
- Conference: Mountain West
- Location: Davis, California
- Home stadium: Dobbins Stadium (capacity: 3,500)
- Nickname: Aggies
- Colors: Yale blue and gold

NCAA tournament appearances
- 2008

The UC Davis Aggies baseball team represents the University of California, Davis in the sport of baseball. The team competes in Division I of the National Collegiate Athletic Association (NCAA) and in the Mountain West Conference (MW). They are currently led by head coach Tommy Nicholson, who has held the position since 2022.

The Aggies competed at the NCAA Division II level through 2005. At that level, they appeared in the NCAA Division II Baseball Championship 7 times, including two appearances in the College World Series, where they earned fifth-place finishes each time. At the Division I level, the Aggies have made one appearance in the NCAA Division I Baseball Championship: an at-large berth in 2008, where they finished 1–2 in regional competition.

In 2008, future major leaguer Ty Kelly led the Big West Conference with a .397 batting average as a sophomore, and was #2 in the Big West Conference in hits with 94; his career batting average and hits total rank second and third, respectively, in Aggies history.

== Aggies in the NCAA Division I Baseball tournament ==
UC Davis has appeared in the NCAA Division I baseball tournament once. They have a record of 1–2.

Year	Round	Opponent	Result
2008	Stanford Regional	Stanford	W 4–2
2008	Stanford Regional	Pepperdine	L 4–7
2008	Stanford Regional	Stanford	L 4–8

== Controversy ==
In July 2021, the entire UC Davis Aggies baseball program was suspended and the coaching staff was placed on administrative leave due to allegations of misconduct. An internal investigation found that players engaged in hazing rituals that included binge drinking, eating live goldfish, strippers, and threats of sexual assault. The team was allowed to resume some activities in October under the supervision of an interim coaching staff. Manager Matt Vaughn resigned in November after the administration found he had failed to address concerns regarding a complaint about hazing from 2018.

== See also ==
- List of NCAA Division I baseball programs
