= Anteater Ballpark =

Baseball stadium at the University of California, Irvine

Coordinates: 33°39′5″N 117°50′50″W

Cicerone Field at Anteater Ballpark
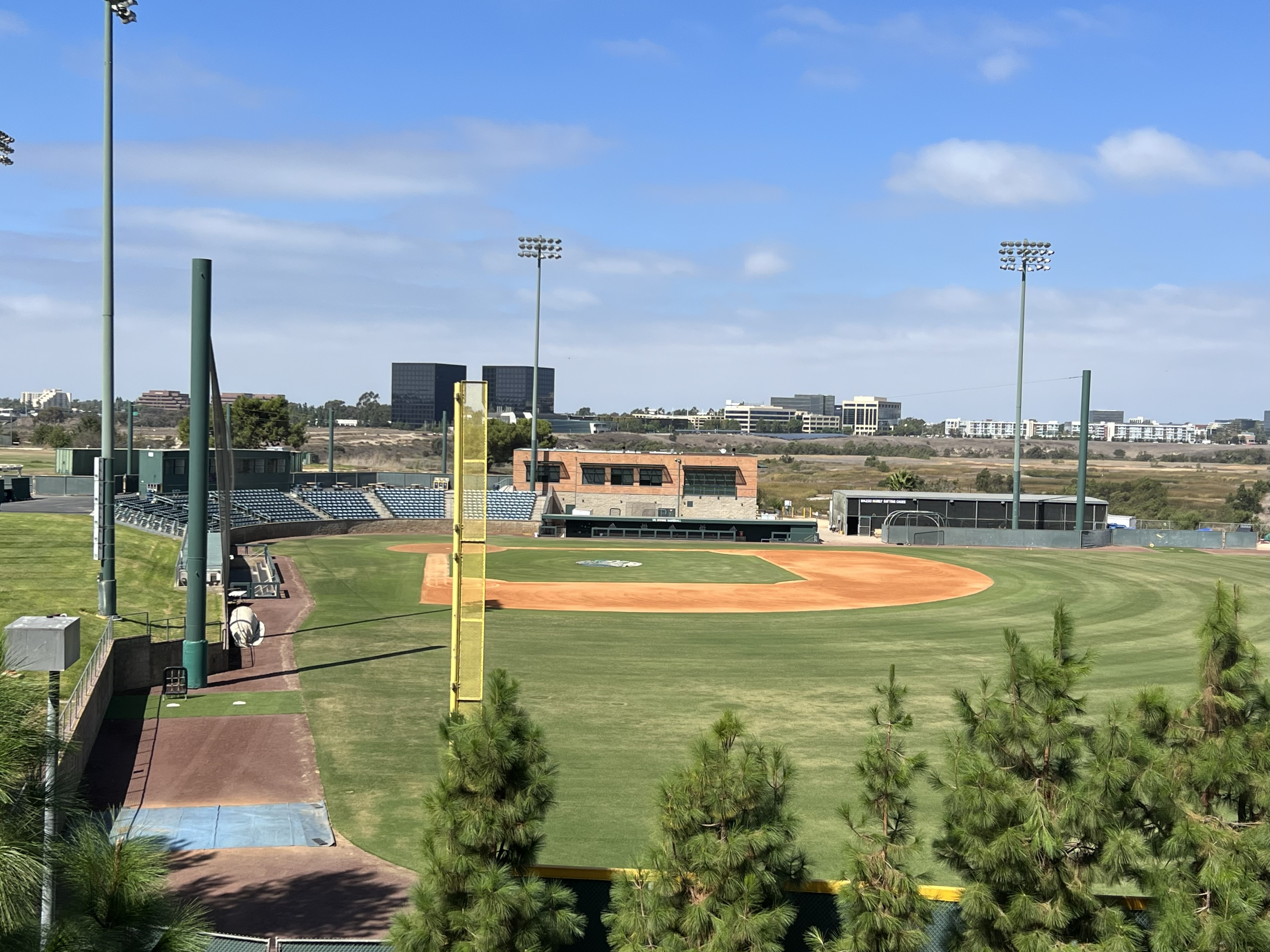
- Anteater Ballpark in 2022
- Interactive map of Cicerone Field at Anteater Ballpark
- Former names: Anteater Ballpark (2002–2009)
- Location: Irvine, California
- Owner: University of California, Irvine
- Capacity: 3,408
- Surface: Bermuda grass
- Record attendance: 3,083 (January 25, 2002) Opening Day vs. San Diego
- Field size: Left Field: 335 feet (102 m); Center Field: 405 feet (123 m); Right Field: 355 feet (108 m)

Construction
- Opened: 2002
- Cost: $8.4 million

Tenant
- UC Irvine Anteaters baseball (2002–present)

Cicerone Field at Anteater Ballpark is the ballpark at the University of California, Irvine in Irvine, California, United States. It is the home stadium of the UC Irvine Anteaters baseball team. Opened in 2002, the stadium has 908 seats and can accommodate up to an additional 2,500 people on a grass berm. The record attendance of 3,083 occurred on opening day of the revival of the team, January 25, 2002, against the University of San Diego.

In 2009, the ballpark's field was named for Ralph J. Cicerone, the university's chancellor from 1998 to 2005.

== See also ==
- List of NCAA Division I baseball venues
