= 2009 West Coast Conference Baseball Championship Series =

2009 West Coast Conference baseball tournament
- Teams: 4
- Format: Double-elimination
- Finals site: Patterson Baseball Complex; Spokane, Washington
- Champions: Gonzaga (1st title)
- Winning coach: Mark Machtolf (1st title)
- MVP: Player: Ryan Wiegand (Gonzaga); Pitcher: Steven Ames (Gonzaga) ()

2009 West Coast Conference baseball standings
	Conf.				Overall
Team	W		L	PCT	W		L	PCT
Gonzaga ‍†‍‡‍^{y}	14	–	7	.667	36	–	18	.667
Loyola Marymount ‍‍‍	13	–	8	.619	30	–	29	.508
San Francisco ‍‍‍	12	–	9	.571	38	–	28	.576
Pepperdine ‍‍‍	12	–	9	.571	31	–	23	.574
San Diego ‍‍‍	11	–	10	.524	29	–	25	.537
Saint Mary's ‍‍‍	9	–	12	.429	28	–	27	.509
Portland ‍‍‍	7	–	14	.333	25	–	26	.490
Santa Clara ‍‍‍	6	–	15	.286	19	–	34	.358
† – Conference champion ‡ – Championship Series champion y – Invited to the NCAA tournament As of June 30, 2009; Rankings from Collegiate Baseball

The 2009 West Coast Conference Baseball Championship Series was held on May 22 and 23, 2009 at San Diego's home stadium, Patterson Baseball Complex in Spokane, Washington, and pitted the top two finishers from the WCC regular season. The event determined the champion of the West Coast Conference for the 2009 NCAA Division I baseball season. Gonzaga won the series two games to none over Loyola Marymount and earned the league's automatic bid to the 2009 NCAA Division I baseball tournament. This would be the final postseason conference championship for the WCC until a four-team tournament was launched in 2013.

== Seeding ==
Team	W–L	Pct	GB
Gonzaga	14–7	.667	—
Loyola Marymount	13–8	.619	1
San Francisco	12–9	.571	2
Pepperdine	12–9	.571	2
San Diego	11–10	.500	3
Saint Mary's	9–12	.429	5
Portland	7–14	.333	7
Santa Clara	6–15	.286	8

== Results ==
Game One

May 22, 2009
Team	R
Loyola Marymount	3
Gonzaga	4

Game Two

May 23, 2009
Team	R
Gonzaga	14
Loyola Marymount	3
