= 2027 UC Irvine Anteaters baseball team =

American college baseball season

2027 UC Irvine Anteaters baseball
- Conference: Big West Conference
- Record: 0–0 (0–0 Big West)
- Head coach: Ben Orloff (9th season)
- Assistant coaches: Erich Pfohl (4th season); CJ Yogi (4th season); Nick Mistone (1st season)
- Hitting coach: J.T. Bloodworth (9th season)
- Pitching coach: Daniel Bibona (15th season)
- Home stadium: Cicerone Field

2027 Big West Conference baseball standings
	Conf.				Overall
Team	W		L	PCT	W		L	PCT
California Baptist ‍‍‍	0	–	0	–	0	–	0	–
Cal Poly ‍‍‍	0	–	0	–	0	–	0	–
Cal State Bakersfield ‍‍‍	0	–	0	–	0	–	0	–
Cal State Fullerton ‍‍‍	0	–	0	–	0	–	0	–
Cal State Northridge ‍‍‍	0	–	0	–	0	–	0	–
Long Beach State ‍‍‍	0	–	0	–	0	–	0	–
Sacramento State ‍‍‍	0	–	0	–	0	–	0	–
UC Irvine ‍‍‍	0	–	0	–	0	–	0	–
UC Riverside ‍‍‍	0	–	0	–	0	–	0	–
UC San Diego ‍‍‍	0	–	0	–	0	–	0	–
UC Santa Barbara ‍‍‍	0	–	0	–	0	–	0	–
Utah Valley ‍‍‍	0	–	0	–	0	–	0	–
† – Conference champion ‡ – Tournament champion y – Invited to the NCAA tournament As of November 12, 2026; Rankings from D1Baseball

The 2027 UC Irvine Anteaters baseball team represent the University of California, Irvine during the 2027 NCAA Division I baseball season. The Anteaters will play their home games at Cicerone Field as a member of the Big West Conference. They are led by head coach Ben Orloff in his ninth season as manager. The top five teams in the Big West Conference will play in the conference's postseason tournament, with the winner receiving the automatic bid to the 2027 NCAA tournament. For the first time, the Big West Conference baseball tournament will be held on an off-campus site, at ONT Field in Ontario, California.

== Previous season ==
It was announced on January 9, 2026, that head coach Ben Orloff signed a 5-year contract extension, keeping him with the team until the end of the 2030 season. Last season, UC Irvine finished with a 25–27 record, going 14–16 in the Big West, and finishing in a tie for sixth in the conference. They failed to make the conference tournament despite serving as host. It marked the first season since 2023 the Anteaters did not make the NCAA tournament, as well as the first season since 2017 that they did not post a winning record, the first of which under Coach Orloff.

== Preseason ==
=== Big West Preseason Poll and Team ===
The Big West Coaches' Poll and Team has not been released yet.

== Personnel ==
=== Starters ===
Lineup
Pos.	No.	Player.	Year
C			
1B			
2B			
3B			
SS			
LF			
CF			
RF			
DH			

Weekend pitching rotation
Day	No.	Player.	Year
Friday			
Saturday			
Sunday			

=== Roster ===
2027 UC Irvine Anteaters baseball team
Players
Coaches

#	Pos.	Name	B/T	Height	Weight	Year	Home town
1	OF	Zach Doyle	L/L	5 ft 10 in (1.78 m)	180 lb (82 kg)	Jr	Ladera Ranch, CA
2	OF	Tommy Farmer	R/R	6 ft 3 in (1.91 m)	210 lb (95 kg)	Sr	Santa Monica, CA
4	OF	Davis D'Errico	R/R	5 ft 10 in (1.78 m)	190 lb (86 kg)	Jr	Los Alamitos, CA
5	INF	James Castagnola	R/R	6 ft 1 in (1.85 m)	195 lb (88 kg)	RS Sr	San Diego, CA
8	RHP	Reece Van Alen	R/R	6 ft 0 in (1.83 m)	165 lb (75 kg)	So	Fresno, CA
9	INF	Dylan Hillman	R/R	6 ft 0 in (1.83 m)	180 lb (82 kg)	Jr	Danville, CA
10	INF	Braden Oliver	R/R	6 ft 3 in (1.91 m)	190 lb (86 kg)	Fr	Westlake Village, CA
11	OF	Jaden Valenzuela	L/L	6 ft 2 in (1.88 m)	185 lb (84 kg)	Fr	Chino Hills, CA
12	RHP	Rocky Palacio	R/R	6 ft 2 in (1.88 m)	190 lb (86 kg)	Jr	Irvine, CA
13	INF	Jack Champlin	R/R	5 ft 11 in (1.8 m)	165 lb (75 kg)	Fr	Long Beach, CA
14	C	Will Bandel	R/R	6 ft 1 in (1.85 m)	200 lb (91 kg)	RS Fr	Temecula, CA
15	INF	Lucas Schermer	R/R	6 ft 4 in (1.93 m)	195 lb (88 kg)	So	Hermosa Beach, CA
16	C	Michael Podstreleny	L/R	5 ft 11 in (1.8 m)	190 lb (86 kg)	Jr	San Diego, CA
17	LHP	Troy Khasaempanth	L/L	6 ft 1 in (1.85 m)	165 lb (75 kg)	Fr	Corona, CA
18	UTL	Caleb Derosier	R/R	6 ft 4 in (1.93 m)	200 lb (91 kg)	Fr	Pasadena, CA
20	RHP	Tim Grack	R/R	6 ft 1 in (1.85 m)	205 lb (93 kg)	Sr	Fountain Valley, CA
21	UTL	Landon Gaz	R/R	6 ft 2 in (1.88 m)	230 lb (104 kg)	Sr	Moorpark, CA
22	RHP	Hunter Manning	L/R	6 ft 5 in (1.96 m)	220 lb (100 kg)	Fr	Valencia, CA
23	LHP	Dane Grant	L/L	6 ft 2 in (1.88 m)	185 lb (84 kg)	Jr	San Juan Capistrano, CA
24	INF	Auggie Gutierrez	R/R	5 ft 11 in (1.8 m)	195 lb (88 kg)	RS Sr	Yorba Linda, CA
25	UTL	Alonso Reyes	L/R	6 ft 0 in (1.83 m)	190 lb (86 kg)	RS Sr	Inglewood, CA
26	INF	Noah Alvarez	L/R	6 ft 1 in (1.85 m)	170 lb (77 kg)	Sr	Chino, CA
27	LHP	Brandon Luu	L/L	6 ft 2 in (1.88 m)	200 lb (91 kg)	Sr	Irvine, CA
28	OF	Ryan Lopetegui	R/R	6 ft 2 in (1.88 m)	205 lb (93 kg)	Sr	Redondo Beach, CA
30	RHP	Peyton Rodgers	R/R	6 ft 0 in (1.83 m)	180 lb (82 kg)	Jr	Solana Beach, CA
31	LHP	Nathaniel Pimentel	L/L	6 ft 1 in (1.85 m)	205 lb (93 kg)	So	Rancho Cucamonga, CA
32	LHP	Zane Nordquist	L/L	5 ft 11 in (1.8 m)	170 lb (77 kg)	So	Oceanside, CA
33	RHP	Tyler Foster	R/R	6 ft 1 in (1.85 m)	190 lb (86 kg)	Jr	Carlsbad, CA
35	C	Connor Dietsch	R/R	6 ft 2 in (1.88 m)	195 lb (88 kg)	RS Sr	Mission Viejo, CA
36	INF	Zach Fjelstad	L/R	5 ft 11 in (1.8 m)	205 lb (93 kg)	Sr	Coto de Caza, CA
37	RHP	Julian Custer	R/R	6 ft 1 in (1.85 m)	180 lb (82 kg)	Sr	San Diego, CA
38	OF	Daniel Polasek	L/R	6 ft 1 in (1.85 m)	180 lb (82 kg)	Jr	Martinez, CA
40	RHP	Thomas Padilla	R/R	6 ft 4 in (1.93 m)	185 lb (84 kg)	Fr	Corona, CA
41	RHP	Cade Castles	R/R	6 ft 2 in (1.88 m)	170 lb (77 kg)	So	Davis, CA
43	RHP	Tyler Wood	R/R	6 ft 3 in (1.91 m)	190 lb (86 kg)	Sr	Danville, CA
44	UTL	Alex Schmidt	R/R	6 ft 2 in (1.88 m)	210 lb (95 kg)	So	Sherman Oaks, CA
45	RHP	Kassius Smith	R/R	6 ft 3 in (1.91 m)	220 lb (100 kg)	Gr	Los Angeles, CA
50	C	Efren Ortega II	R/R	5 ft 11 in (1.8 m)	190 lb (86 kg)	Jr	Sylmar, CA
55	RHP	Alex Umland	R/R	6 ft 4 in (1.93 m)	220 lb (100 kg)	Jr	Los Angeles, CA
88	RHP	Emmett Kopp	R/R	6 ft 7 in (2.01 m)	230 lb (104 kg)	Fr	San Clemente, CA

Head coach

Ben Orloff

Assistant coach(es)

Daniel Bibona
J.T. Bloodworth
Ryan Johnston

Legend

- (C) Team captain
- (S) Suspended
- (I) Ineligible
- Injured
- Current redshirt

Roster
Last update: November 12, 2026

== Schedule ==
Along with their regular season schedule, UC Irvine also played scrimmages against Arizona State, UCLA, and Fresno State in the fall. They also will play an exhibition match against alumni in January.

Legend
	Anteaters win
	Anteaters loss
	Postponement
**Bold**	Anteaters team member

2027 UC Irvine Anteaters baseball game log (0–0)
Regular season (0–0)

February
Date	Time	TV	Opponent	Rank	Stadium	Score	Win	Loss	Save	Attendance	Overall	BW Record
February 19	6:00 p.m.	ACCNX	at California		Evans Diamond; Berkeley, CA	—	—	—	—	—	—	—
February 20	2:00 p.m.	ACCNX	at California		Evans Diamond	—	—	—	—	—	—	—
February 21	1:00 p.m.	ACCNX	at California		Evans Diamond	—	—	—	—	—	—	—
February 22	1:00 p.m.	ACCNX	at California		Evans Diamond	—	—	—	—	—	—	—
February 26	6:00 p.m.	ESPN+	Lamar		Cicerone Field; Irvine, CA	—	—	—	—	—	—	—
February 27	1:00 p.m.	ESPN+	Lamar		Cicerone Field	—	—	—	—	—	—	—
February 28	1:00 p.m.	ESPN+	Lamar		Cicerone Field	—	—	—	—	—	—	—

March
Date	Time	TV	Opponent	Rank	Stadium	Score	Win	Loss	Save	Attendance	Overall	BW Record
March 2	TBA	MW+	at Grand Canyon		Brazell Field at GCU Ballpark; Phoenix, AZ	—	—	—	—	—	—	—
March 3	TBA	MW+	at Grand Canyon		Brazell Field at GCU Ballpark	—	—	—	—	—	—	—
Frisco College Baseball Classic
March 5	4:00 p.m.	D1Baseball.com	vs. Oklahoma		Riders Field; Frisco, TX	—	—	—	—	—	—	—
March 6	10:00 a.m.	D1Baseball.com	vs. Southern Miss		Riders Field	—	—	—	—	—	—	—
March 7	9:00 a.m.	D1Baseball.com	vs. Kansas		Riders Field	—	—	—	—	—	—	—
March 9	6:00 p.m.	ESPN+	Pepperdine		Cicerone Field; Irvine, CA	—	—	—	—	—	—	—
March 11	TBA	ESPN+	at BYU		Larry H. Miller Sports Complex; Provo, UT	—	—	—	—	—	—	—
March 12	TBA	ESPN+	at BYU		Larry H. Miller Sports Complex	—	—	—	—	—	—	—
March 13	TBA	ESPN+	at BYU		Larry H. Miller Sports Complex	—	—	—	—	—	—	—
March 19	6:00 p.m.	ESPN+	Utah Valley		Cicerone Field	—	—	—	—	—	—	—
March 20	1:00 p.m.	ESPN+	Utah Valley		Cicerone Field	—	—	—	—	—	—	—
March 21	1:00 p.m.	ESPN+	Utah Valley		Cicerone Field	—	—	—	—	—	—	—
March 23	6:00 p.m.	ESPN+	at San Diego		Fowler Park; San Diego, CA	—	—	—	—	—	—	—
March 25	TBA	ESPN+	at Cal State Northridge		Matador Field; Northridge, CA	—	—	—	—	—	—	—
March 26	TBA	ESPN+	at Cal State Northridge		Matador Field	—	—	—	—	—	—	—
March 27	TBA	ESPN+	at Cal State Northridge		Matador Field	—	—	—	—	—	—	—
March 30	6:00 p.m.	ESPN+	San Diego State		Cicerone Field	—	—	—	—	—	—	—

April
Date	Time	TV	Opponent	Rank	Stadium	Score	Win	Loss	Save	Attendance	Overall	BW Record
April 2	TBA	ESPN+	at Cal Poly		Baggett Stadium; San Luis Obispo, CA	—	—	—	—	—	—	—
April 3	TBA	ESPN+	at Cal Poly		Baggett Stadium	—	—	—	—	—	—	—
April 4	TBA	ESPN+	at Cal Poly		Baggett Stadium	—	—	—	—	—	—	—
April 6	TBA	B1G+	at USC		Dedeaux Field; Los Angeles, CA	—	—	—	—	—	—	—
April 9	6:00 p.m.	ESPN+	UC San Diego		Cicerone Field; Irvine, CA	—	—	—	—	—	—	—
April 10	1:00 p.m.	ESPN+	UC San Diego		Cicerone Field	—	—	—	—	—	—	—
April 11	1:00 p.m.	ESPN+	UC San Diego		Cicerone Field	—	—	—	—	—	—	—
April 13	6:00 p.m.	ESPN+	San Diego		Cicerone Field	—	—	—	—	—	—	—
April 16	TBA	ESPN+	at Sacramento State		John Smith Field; Sacramento, CA	—	—	—	—	—	—	—
April 17	TBA	ESPN+	at Sacramento State		John Smith Field	—	—	—	—	—	—	—
April 18	TBA	ESPN+	at Sacramento State		John Smith Field	—	—	—	—	—	—	—
April 20	6:00 p.m.	ESPN+	USC		Cicerone Field	—	—	—	—	—	—	—
April 23	6:00 p.m.	ESPN+	UC Riverside		Cicerone Field	—	—	—	—	—	—	—
April 24	1:00 p.m.	ESPN+	UC Riverside		Cicerone Field	—	—	—	—	—	—	—
April 25	1:00 p.m.	ESPN+	UC Riverside		Cicerone Field	—	—	—	—	—	—	—
April 27	TBA	Pac-12 YouTube	at San Diego State		Tony Gwynn Stadium; San Diego, CA	—	—	—	—	—	—	—
April 30	TBA	ESPN+	at UC Santa Barbara		Caesar Uyesaka Stadium; Santa Barbara, CA	—	—	—	—	—	—	—

May
Date	Time	TV	Opponent	Rank	Stadium	Score	Win	Loss	Save	Attendance	Overall	BW Record
May 1	TBA	ESPN+	at UC Santa Barbara		Caesar Uyesaka Stadium; Santa Barbara, CA	—	—	—	—	—	—	—
May 2	TBA	ESPN+	at UC Santa Barbara		Caesar Uyesaka Stadium	—	—	—	—	—	—	—
May 4	6:00 p.m.	ESPN+	UCLA		Cicerone Field; Irvine, CA	—	—	—	—	—	—	—
May 7	6:00 p.m.	ESPN+	Long Beach State		Cicerone Field	—	—	—	—	—	—	—
May 8	1:00 p.m.	ESPN+	Long Beach State		Cicerone Field	—	—	—	—	—	—	—
May 9	1:00 p.m.	ESPN+	Long Beach State		Cicerone Field	—	—	—	—	—	—	—
May 11	TBA	B1G+	at UCLA		Jackie Robinson Stadium; Los Angeles, CA	—	—	—	—	—	—	—
May 14	6:00 p.m.	ESPN+	Cal State Fullerton		Cicerone Field	—	—	—	—	—	—	—
May 15	1:00 p.m.	ESPN+	Cal State Fullerton		Cicerone Field	—	—	—	—	—	—	—
May 16	1:00 p.m.	ESPN+	Cal State Fullerton		Cicerone Field	—	—	—	—	—	—	—
May 20	TBA	ESPN+	at Cal Baptist		James W. Totman Stadium; Riverside, CA	—	—	—	—	—	—	—
May 21	TBA	ESPN+	at Cal Baptist		James W. Totman Stadium	—	—	—	—	—	—	—
May 22	TBA	ESPN+	at Cal Baptist		James W. Totman Stadium	—	—	—	—	—	—	—

Postseason

Big West tournament
Date	Time	TV	Opponent	Seed	Site/Stadium	Score	Win	Loss	Save	Attendance	Overall Record	BWT Record
May 26–30	TBA	ESPN+			ONT Field; Ontario, CA							

*Non-conference game. ^{#}Rankings from D1Baseball. (#) Tournament seedings in parentheses.
All times are in Pacific.

== Rankings ==
Ranking movements
	Week																
Poll	Pre	1	2	3	4	5	6	7	8	9	10	11	12	13	14	15	Final
Coaches'		*															
Baseball America																	
NCBWA†																	

† NCBWA ranks 30 teams in their preseason poll, but only ranks 25 teams weekly during the season.
* A new poll was not released for this week, so for comparison purposes, the previous week's ranking is inserted in this week's slot.
