= 2009 UC Irvine Anteaters baseball team =

American college baseball season

2009 UC Irvine Anteaters baseball

Big West Conference champions

Irvine Regional, L to Virginia (eliminated)
- Conference: Big West Conference

Ranking
- Coaches: No. 16
- Record: 45–15 (22–2 Big West)
- Head coach: Mike Gillespie
- Hitting coach: Pat Shine
- Pitching coach: Ted Silva
- Home stadium: Anteater Ballpark

2009 Big West Conference baseball standings
	Conf.				Overall
Team	W		L	PCT	W		L	PCT
No. 9 UC Irvine ‍†‍‍^{y}	22	–	2	.917	45	–	15	.750
No. 7 Cal State Fullerton ‍‍‍^{y}	17	–	7	.708	47	–	16	.746
Cal Poly ‍‍‍^{y}	14	–	10	.583	37	–	21	.638
UC Riverside ‍‍‍	12	–	12	.500	33	–	20	.623
UC Santa Barbara ‍‍‍	11	–	13	.458	29	–	23	.558
Long Beach State ‍‍‍	11	–	13	.458	25	–	29	.463
Pacific ‍‍‍	9	–	15	.375	21	–	32	.396
Cal State Northridge ‍‍‍	7	–	17	.292	24	–	32	.429
UC Davis ‍‍‍	5	–	19	.208	13	–	42	.236
† – Conference champion y – Invited to the NCAA tournament As of June 3, 2009; Rankings from Collegiate Baseball

The 2009 UC Irvine Anteaters baseball team represented the University of California, Irvine in the NCAA Division I baseball season of 2009. The team played their home games at Anteater Ballpark in Irvine, California. The team was coached by Mike Gillespie in his second season at Irvine.

== Pre-season ==
The Anteaters concluded the 2008 season with a 42-18 mark and made their second consecutive trip to the Super Regionals. They are a veteran-filled team, with 17 upperclassmen returning for the 2009 season. On January 20, 2009, the coaches in the Big West picked UC Irvine to finish second in the Big West behind Cal State Fullerton.

== Roster ==
=== Coaches ===
Name	Title	First season at UCI	Alma mater
Mike Gillespie	Head coach	2007	University of Southern California (1962)
Pat Shine	Assistant coach	2002	Gonzaga (1995)
Ted Silva	Assistant coach	2007	Cal State Fullerton (1995)
Bob Macaluso	Assistant coach	2007	Springfield College (1987)

=== Players ===
Players	Number	Position	Bats/Throws	Hometown (Prev School)
Jordan Fox	1	UTL	L/L	Hacienda Heights, Calif. (Bishop Amat)
Sean Madigan	2	OF/LHP	L/L	Yorba Linda, Calif. (Servite)
Daniel Bibona	3	LHP	L/L	Lake Forest, Calif. (Santa Margarita)
Tyler Hoechlin	4	INF	L/R	Corona, Calif. (Arizona State)
Brian Hernandez	5	INF	R/R	Sylmar, Calif. (Cal State LA)
Ben Orloff	6	INF	R/R	Simi Valley, Calif. (Simi Valley)
Sammy Donabedian	7	C	R/R	West Hills, Calif. (El Camino Real)
Cory Olson	8	OF	R/R	Anaheim, Calif. (Orange Coast College)
Tommy Reyes	11	INF	R/R	Rancho Cucomonga, Calif. (Bishop Amat)
Crosby Slaught	13	RHP	R/R	Santa Barbara, Calif. (Santa Barbara)
Jeff Cusick	14	INF	R/R	Mission Viejo, Calif. (Santa Margarita)
Dillon Bell	15	OF	L/L	Bakersfield (Bakersfield)
Brock Bardeen	16	RHP/DH	L/R	Fallbrook, Calif. (Fallbrook)
Kyle Necke	17	RHP	R/R	Walnut, Calif. (Walnut)
Nick Hoover	18	RHP	R/R	Alta Loma (Riverside CC)
Francis Larson	20	C	R/R	Yorba Linda, Calif. (Esperanza)
Christian Bergman	21	RHP	R/R	Altadena, Calif. (St. Francis)
Matt Summers	22	RHP/OF	L/R	Phoenix, Ariz. (Chaparral)
Brian Murphy	23	RHP	R/R	San Clemente, Calif. (San Clemente)
Ronnie Shaeffer	24	C	R/R	Garden Grove, Calif. (Pacifica)
Cory Hamilton	25	RHP	R/R	Elk Grove, Calif. (Sheldon)
Casey Stevenson	27	INF	R/R	Saugus, Calif. (College of the Canyons)
Andy Lines	28	LHP	L/L	Palos Verdes Estates, Calif. (Palos Verdes HS)
Eric Deragisch	29	INF	R/R	Granite Bay, Calif. (Sierra College)
Stephen Malcolm	31	UTL	R/R	Stockton, Calif. (Tokay)
DJ Crumlich	32	UTL	R/R	Irvine, Calif. (Irvine)
Jordan Leyland	33	INF	R/R	San Dimas, Calif. (San Dimas)
Ryan Fisher	36	INF	L/R	Manteca, Calif. (East Union)
Noel Avison	40	LHP	L/L	Bakersfield, Calif. (San Diego Mesa College)
Scott Gottschling	41	OF	R/R	Orange, Calif. (Villa Park)
Matt Dufour	44	RHP	R/R	Placentia, Calif. (Santa Ana CC)
Maverick Olivares	47	OF	L/L	Hacienda Heights, Calif. (Bishop Amat)
Tony Asaro	53	OF	R/R	Torrance, Calif. (Pepperdine)
Eric Pettis	55	RHP	R/R	West Hills, Calif. (El Camino Real)

== Schedule and results ==
2009 Game Log
Regular season

#	Date	Opponent	Location	Score	Win	Loss	Save	Att	Record	Big West
	2/20/09	Hawai'i	Les Murakami Stadium	5-1	Bibona (1-0)	Kramer (0-1)	-	3844	1-0	
	2/21/09	Hawai'i	Les Murakami Stadium	5-4	Bergman (1-0)	Klein (0-1)	Pettis (1)	2643	2-0	
	2/21/09	Hawai'i	Les Murakami Stadium	5-4	Bardeen (1-0)	Capaul (0-1)	Pettis (2)	2643	3-0	
	2/22/09	Hawai'i	Les Murakami Stadium	4-7	Sisto (1-0)	Hoover (0-1)	-	2347	3-1	
	2/27/09	Texas A&M	Minute Maid Park	2-9	Raley (2-0)	Bibona (1-1)	Thebeau (1)	6979	3-2	
	2/28/09	Houston	Minute Maid Park	13-7	Bergman (2-0)	Stuckey (0-1)	-	-	4-2	
	3/1/09	UCLA	Minute Maid Park	7-4	Slaught (1-0)	Brewer (0-1)	Pettis (3)	5356	5-2	
	3/3/09	Loyola Marymount	Anteater Ballpark	3-11	Carreon (1-0)	Hoover (0-2)	-	846	5-3	
	3/6/09	UAH	Baylor Ballpark	13-5	Bibona (2-1)	Roberson (0-2)	-	-	6-3	
	3/7/09	Baylor	Baylor Ballpark	3-4	Verrett (4-0)	Hamilton (0-1)	-	3077	6-4	
	3/8/09	South Alabama	Baylor Ballpark	6-5	Pettis (1-0)	Johnson (1-2)	-	-	7-4	
	3/10/09	Southern California	Dedeaux Field	6-5 (12)	Bardeen (2-0)	Vasquez (0-2)	-	395	8-4	
	3/13/09	Tulane	Anteater Ballpark	7-5	Bardeen (3-0)	Claiborne (1-1)	Pettis (4)	653	9-4	
	3/14/09	Tulane	Anteater Ballpark	3-6	Petiton (3-0)	Bergman (2-1)	Pepitone (3)	563	9-5	
	3/15/09	Tulane	Anteater Ballpark	5-4	Pettis (2-0)	Pepitone (0-3)	-	948	10-5	
	3/20/09	Nevada	Anteater Ballpark	1-0	Bibona (3-1)	Stassi (2-3)	Pettis (5)	363	11-5	
	3/21/09	Nevada	Anteater Ballpark	4-5	Miller (3-0)	Necke (0-1)	-	483	11-6	
	3/22/09	Nevada	Anteater Ballpark	10-2	Slaught (2-0)	Achelpohl (1-2)	-	356	12-6	
	3/24/09	Washington	Anteater Ballpark	17-13	Avison (1-0)	Kittredge (1-2)	-	248	13-6	
	3/25/09	Washington	Anteater Ballpark	12-13	Haehl (1-0)	Necke (0-2)	Kittredge (1)	178	13-7	
	3/27/09	Cal Poly	Anteater Ballpark	5-2	Bibona (4-1)	Mauldin (3-2)	Pettis (6)	563	14-7	1-0
	3/28/09	Cal Poly	Anteater Ballpark	11-3	Bergman (3-1)	Leonard (3-1)	-	615	15-7	2-0
	3/29/09	Cal Poly	Anteater Ballpark	7-6	Bardeen (4-0)	Radeke (1-1)	Pettis (7)	668	16-7	3-0
	3/31/09	Loyola Marymount	George C. Page Stadium	19-8	Avison (2-0)	Lally (0-2)	-	213	17-7	3-0
	4/3/09	Cal State Fullerton	Goodwin Field	2-1	Bibona (5-1)	Renken (4-2)	Pettis (8)	2711	18-7	4-0
	4/4/09	Cal State Fullerton	Goodwin Field	6-1	Bergman (4-1)	Ramirez (3-1)	Bardeen (1)	3056	19-7	5-0
	4/5/09	Cal State Fullerton	Goodwin Field	4-5	Ackland (2-0)	Pettis (2-1)	-	3216	19-8	5-1
	4/7/09	UCLA	Jackie Robinson Stadium	3-8	Rasmussen (2-2)	Hamilton (0-2)	-	535	19-9	5-1
	4/9/09	Long Beach State	Anteater Ballpark	3-2 (12)	Pettis (3-1)	Corrales (0-1)	-	745	20-9	6-1
	4/10/09	Long Beach State	Anteater Ballpark	6-3	Bergman (5-1)	Thompson (2-5)	Pettis (9)	764	21-9	7-1
	4/11/09	Long Beach State	Anteater Ballpark	9-5	Slaught (3-0)	Gagnon (2-4)	Necke (1)	923	22-9	8-1
	4/13/09	Loyola Marymount	Anteater Ballpark	6-4	Necke (1-2)	Eusebio (3-3)	Pettis (10)	523	23-9	8-1
	4/14/09	San Diego	John Cunningham Stadium	4-7	Hauser (2-1)	Avison (2-1)	Campbell (2)	187	23-10	8-1
	4/17/09	UC Riverside	Riverside Sports Complex	16-1	Bilbona (6-1)	Bargas (4-3)	-	431	24-10	9-1
	4/18/09	UC Riverside	Riverside Sports Complex	9-6	Bergman (6-1)	Andriese (3-2)	Pettis (11)	538	25-10	10-1
	4/19/09	UC Riverside	Riverside Sports Complex	12-9	Dufour (1-0)	Larkins (1-1)	Pettis (12)	257	26-10	11-1
	4/20/09	Oregon	Anteater Ballpark	9-6	Dufour (2-0)	Thornton (0-1)	-	818	27-10	11-1
	4/21/09	Oregon	Anteater Ballpark	7-4	Avison (3-1)	Whitmore (0-6)	Pettis (13)	467	28-10	11-1
	4/23/09	Utah	Spring Mobile Ballpark	8-3	Bibona (7-1)	Budrow (4-3)	-	190	29-10	11-1
	4/24/09	Utah	Spring Mobile Ballpark	10-1	Bergman (7-1)	Wilding (1-5)	-	330	30-10	11-1
	4/25/09	Utah	Spring Mobile Ballpark	3-7	Whatcott (3-1)	Necke (1-3)	-	186	30-11	11-1
	4/28/09	Southern California	Anteater Ballpark	6-5	Pettis (4-1)	Vasquez (2-4)	-	1152	31-11	11-1
	5/1/09	Cal State Northridge	Anteater Ballpark	7-1	Bibona (8-1)	Juarez (4-5)	-	793	32-11	12-1
	5/2/09	Cal State Northridge	Anteater Ballpark	12-7	Bergman (8-1)	Gorski (1-3)	-	657	33-11	13-1
	5/3/09	Cal State Northridge	Anteater Ballpark	5-2	Slaught (4-0)	Ott (1-4)	Pettis (14)	1215	34-11	14-1
	5/8/09	Pacific	Klein Family Field	11-6	Bilbona (9-1)	Centanni (4-5)	-	882	35-11	15-1
	5/9/09	Pacific	Klein Family Field	5-4	Bardeen (5-0)	McCain (2-2)	Pettis (15)	789	36-11	16-1
	5/10/09	Pacific	Klein Family Field	6-4	Slaught (5-0)	Niley (1-4)	Pettis (16)	600	37-11	17-1
	5/12/09	San Diego	Anteater Ballpark	2-9	Hauser (5-2)	Pettis (4-2)	-	587	37-12	14-1
	5/15/09	UC Davis	Anteater Ballpark	9-3	Bilbona (10-1)	Chew (1-7)	-	1597	38-12	18-1
	5/16/09	UC Davis	Anteater Ballpark	19-6	Bergman (9-1)	Lyman (0-4)	-	608	39-12	19-1
	5/17/09	UC Davis	Anteater Ballpark	8-1	Slaught (6-0)	Quist (2-6)	-	1102	40-12	20-1
	5/19/09	UCLA	Anteater Ballpark	5-4 (10)	Pettis (5-2)	Cole (4-7)	-	2762	41-12	20-1
	5/22/09	UC Santa Barbara	Caesar Uyesaka Stadium	11-7	Bibona (11-1)	Ford (4-5)	Dufour (1)	598	42-12	21-1
	5/23/09	UC Santa Barbara	Caesar Uyesaka Stadium	2-8	Hollands (6-6)	Bergman (9-2)	-	590	42-13	21-2
	5/24/09	UC Santa Barbara	Caesar Uyesaka Stadium	15-3	Slaught (7-0)	Samuels (3-3)	-	786	43-13	22-2

NCAA tournament: Irvine Regional (Host)

#	Date	Opponent	Location	Score	Win	Loss	Save	Att	Record	NCAAT Record
	5/29/09	Fresno State	Anteater Ballpark	4-2	Bibona (12-1)	Benny (4-4)	Pettis (17)	3002	44-13	1-0
	5/30/09	Virginia	Anteater Ballpark	0-5	Hultzen (10-2)	Bergman (8-2)	-	2282	44-14	1-1
	5/31/09	San Diego State	Anteater Ballpark	14-3	Slaught (8-0)	Rasmussen (1-2)	-	1856	45-14	2-1
	5/31/09	Virginia	Anteater Ballpark	1-4	Carraway (7-1)	Necke (1-4)	Arico (11)	1500	45-15	2-2

== Rankings ==
Ranking movements Legend: ██ Increase in ranking ██ Decrease in ranking
	Week																	
Poll	Pre	1	2	3	4	5	6	7	8	9	10	11	12	13	14	15	16	Final
Coaches'	18	18*	12	14	13	13	13	10	7	6	3	2	1	1	1	1*	1*	16
Baseball America	9	5	5	10	10	10	8	5	3	1	1	1	1	1	1	9	10	10
Collegiate Baseball^	20	15	15	16	17	13	12	7	4	1	1	1	1	1	1	11	9	9
NCBWA†	15	14	11	15	13	12	12	10	7	6	4	2	1	1	1	11	13	13

^ Collegiate Baseball ranked 40 teams in their preseason poll, but only ranked 30 teams weekly during the season.
† NCBWA ranks 30 teams in their preseason poll, but only ranks 25 teams weekly during the season.
* A new poll was not released for this week, so for comparison purposes, the previous week's ranking is inserted in this week's slot.

Several weeks of the Coaches' poll are unavailable.

== Major League Baseball draft ==
Player	Year	Round	Pick	Team
Ben Orloff	Sr.	9	281	Houston Astros
Daniel Bibona	Jr.	16	489	St. Louis Cardinals
Casey Stevenson	Jr.	38	1156	Milwaukee Brewers
Brian Hernandez	Jr.	39	1175	Cleveland Indians
