= Modesto Nuts =

- 1946–2025; Modesto, California

Team logo	Cap insignia

Minor league affiliations
- Class: Single-A (2021–2025); Class A-Advanced (1990–2020); Class A (1963–1964, 1966–1989); Class C (1946–1962)
- League: California League (1946–1964, 1966–2025)

Major league affiliations
- Team: Seattle Mariners (2017–2025); Colorado Rockies (2005–2016); Oakland Athletics (1975–2004); St. Louis Cardinals (1967–1974); Kansas City Athletics (1966); Houston Colt .45s (1962–1964); New York Yankees (1954–1961); Milwaukee Braves (1953); Pittsburgh Pirates (1949–1952); St. Louis Browns (1948); Independent (1946–1947)

Minor league titles
- League titles (11): 1950; 1954; 1959; 1966; 1972; 1982; 1984; 2004; 2017; 2023; 2024
- Division titles (5): 2004; 2012; 2017; 2023; 2024
- First-half titles (1): 2024
- Second-half titles (1): 2023

Team data
- Name: Modesto Nuts (2005–2025); Modesto A's (1975–2004); Modesto Reds (1966–1974); Modesto Colts (1962–1964); Modesto Reds (1946–1961)
- Mascots: Al The Almond; Wally The Walnut; Shelley The Pistachio
- Ballpark: John Thurman Field
- Website: milb.com/modesto

The Modesto Nuts were a Minor League Baseball team of the California League, most recently the Single-A affiliate of the Seattle Mariners. They were located in Modesto, California, and were named for the several types of nuts grown in the Central Valley. They played their home games at John Thurman Field, which opened in 1955.

The team was known as the Modesto Athletics (or A's) from 1975 to 2004. The club was also known as the Modesto Reds (1966–1974 and 1946–1961) and Modesto Colts (1962–1964).

The Nuts were expected to leave Modesto following the 2024 season after the city and the Mariners were unable to agree on paying for ballpark improvements that Major League Baseball required. However, a deal was reached to keep the team in Modesto through at least the 2025 season. After the 2024 season, the Mariners sold the team to Diamond Baseball Holdings, who immediately announced that the 2025 season would be the last in Modesto. For the 2026 season, as part of a shuffle of Diamond-owned team relocations, the Nuts franchise relocated to San Bernardino as a new incarnation of the Inland Empire 66ers.

== History ==
HWS Baseball purchased the Modesto Minor League Baseball franchise in 2005. The franchise became an affiliate of the Colorado Rockies that year. The Nuts nicknames was selected by fans in an online vote, over the names Crop Dusters, Derailers, Steel, and Strikes. Nuts relates to the agricultural industry in the region. Fans and a Modesto Bee sports columnist were initially negative about all five potential names.

On June 2, 2006, manager Chad Kreuter resigned to become the head coach of the University of Southern California Trojans. Kreuter replaced his father-in-law, Mike Gillespie. Hitting coach Glenallen Hill was named the new Nuts manager.

After the 2006 season, John Thurman Field was renovated with a new scoreboard and upgraded infield. The following opening day, April 7, 2007, was the largest crowd ever at a Modesto minor league game.

On June 21, 2011, the Nuts hosted the 2011 California League/Carolina League All-Star Game. The California League won, with Jedd Gyorko and Rey Navarro named MVPs.

In 2011, the Nuts set their attendance record for five straight seasons and were honored as back-to-back California League Organization of the Year for 2010 and 2011.

Following the 2016 season, the Seattle Mariners purchased a majority share of the Nuts, and the teams entered into a player development contract making Modesto a Mariners affiliate. HWS Baseball continued to manage the team's day-to-day operations.

The Nuts won the California League championship in 2017, sweeping both the division series and the league series and winning nine games in a row dating back to the final three regular-season games. This was the Nuts' ninth league title and the first as part of the Mariners organization.

In conjunction with Major League Baseball (MLB)'s restructuring of Minor League Baseball in 2021, the Nuts were organized into the Low-A West. In 2022, Low-A West was renamed the California League, the name historically used by the regional circuit prior to the 2021 reorganization and was reclassified as a Single-A circuit. In 2023, Modesto won the California League championship.

After the city of Modesto and the Mariners were unable to come to terms on who would pay for the roughly $32 million in improvements to John Thurman Field mandated by MLB, the Nuts planned to leave Modesto after the 2024 season. However, the city and the Nuts came to an agreement in August 2024 to keep the team in Modesto for another year. The Nuts agreed to pay an annual rent of $600,000 with an additional $75,000 for improving the field. A long-term lease agreement had to be reached by April 1, 2025, or the team could leave following the season. A month after it was announced the Nuts would stay in Modesto for another year, they won their second straight California League title.

The team was sold to Diamond Baseball Holdings on December 12, 2024. Diamond, the largest owner of MiLB teams, planned a "musical chairs" format in the aftermath of the purchase that will take effect in the 2026 season. The Nuts would move to San Bernardino and assume the Inland Empire 66ers nickname, but keep the Mariners' affiliation, reuniting the two for the first time since 2006. The 66ers would relocate to Rancho Cucamonga and assume the Rancho Cucamonga Quakes nickname and be affiliated with the Los Angeles Angels for the first time since 2010. The Quakes will move to Ontario and a new 6,000-seat stadium being built there to become the Ontario Tower Buzzers.

The Nuts played their final home game on August 31, 2025, losing to the Stockton Ports, 5–4, with 2,295 people in attendance. Their final game was played on September 8 against the San Jose Giants at Excite Ballpark, winning 9–6 in 10 innings.

Josh Suchon was the team's radio play-by-play broadcaster in 2007. Greg Young was the team's play-by-play broadcaster from 2008 to 2011. He was replaced by Alex Margulies for 2012 and 2013. Keaton Gillogly did play-by-play from 2014 to 2022. Mario Ramos, who had been the PA announcer, was the team's final play-by-play broadcaster.

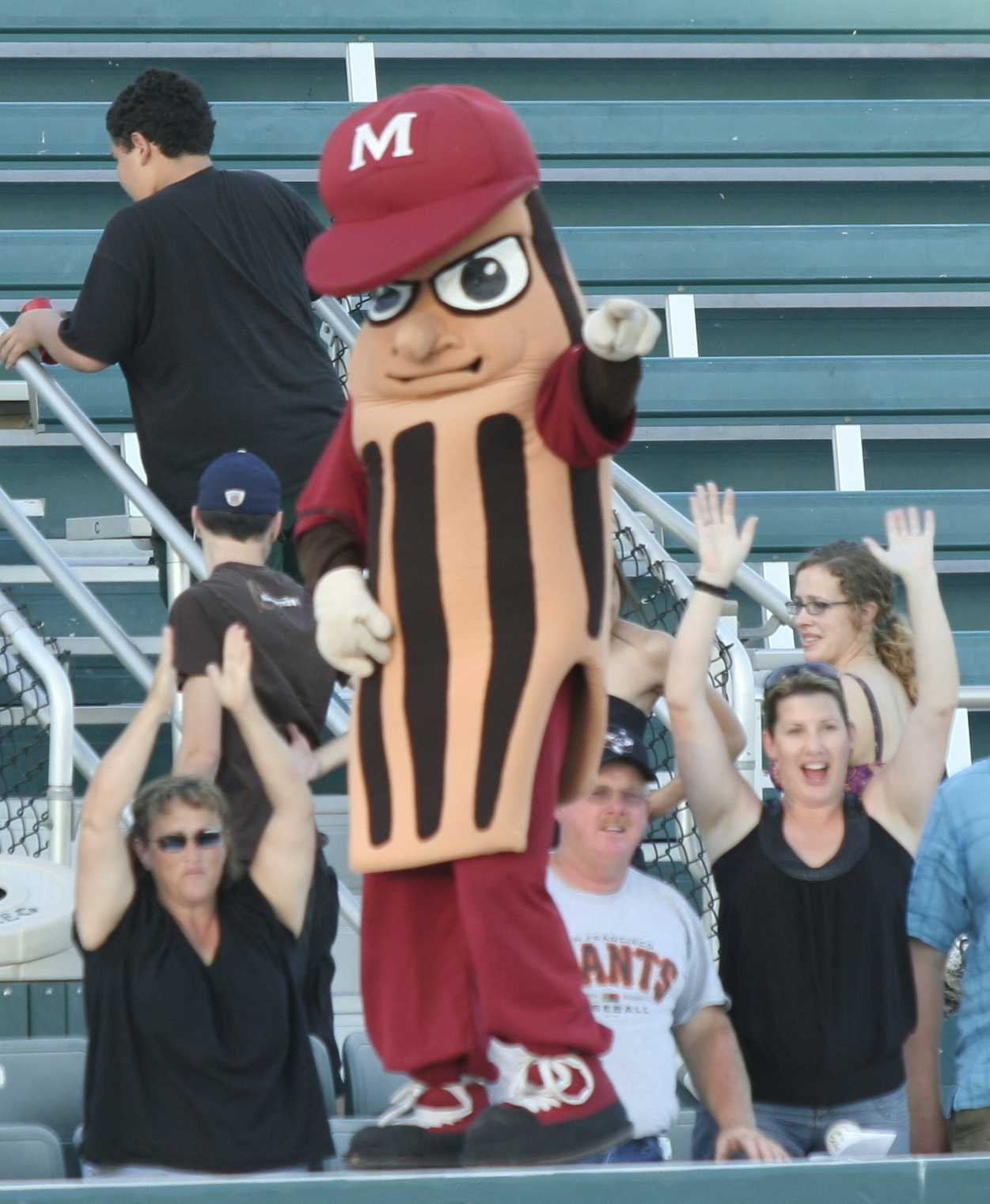
A Nuts mascot in 2009

== Mascots ==
The Nuts had three mascots: Al the Almond, Wally the Walnut, and Shelley the Pistachio.

== Notable alumni ==
Years with the Nuts or other Modesto minor league team are listed in parentheses.

=== Baseball Hall of Fame alumni ===
- Sparky Anderson (1967, manager) Inducted, 2000
- Rollie Fingers (1966) Inducted, 1992
- Rickey Henderson (1977) Inducted, 2009
- Reggie Jackson (1966) Inducted, 1993
- Tony LaRussa (1966) Inducted, 2014
- Joe Morgan (1963) Inducted, 1990
- Ted Simmons (1968) Inducted, 2020

=== Other notable alumni ===
The following players were MLB All-Stars, league leaders, and/or award winners

- Nolan Arenado (2011) 8× All-Star
- Tony Batista (1994) 2× All-Star
- Charlie Blackmon (2009, 2016) 2× All-Star, 2017 NL Batting Title
- Mike Bordick (1987, 1995) All-Star
- Tom Burgmeier (1962–1963) All-Star
- Jose Canseco (1984) 6× All-Star, 1986 AL Rookie of the Year, 1988 AL Most Valuable Player (MVP)
- Ron Coomer (1988) All-Star
- José Cruz (1968) 2× All-Star
- Nelson Cruz (2004) 7× All-Star, 4× Silver Slugger, Roberto Clemente Award
- John Denny (1972) 1976 NL ERA Leader, 1983 NL Cy Young Award
- Corey Dickerson (2012, 2015) All-Star
- Dave Duncan (1966) All-Star
- Jermaine Dye (2002) All-Star, 2005 World Series MVP
- Andre Ethier (2004) 2× All-Star, Silver Slugger, Gold Glove Award
- Dexter Fowler (2007) All-Star
- Bob Forsch (1969–1970) 2× Silver Slugger
- Jason Giambi (1993) 5× All-Star, 2000 AL MVP
- Ben Grieve (1995–1996) All-Star, 1998 AL Rookie of the Year
- Von Hayes (2004, manager) All-Star
- Jay Howell (1986) 3× All-Star
- Rick Honeycutt (1991) 2× All-Star, 1983 AL ERA Leader
- Al Hrabosky (1969) 1975 NL saves leader (tied)
- Hisashi Iwakuma (2017) All-Star
- Matt Keough (1975) All-Star
- Darren Lewis (1989) Gold Glove Award
- Ryan Ludwick (2000) All-Star
- Bake McBride (1970–1971) All-Star, 1974 NL Rookie of the Year
- Mark McGwire (1984–1985) 12× All-Star, 5× MLB home run champion, 1987 Rookie of the Year
- Willie Montanez (1968) All-Star
- Dwayne Murphy (1975, 1986) 6× Gold Glove Award
- Joe Rudi (1966) 3× All-Star
- Dick Stuart (1951) All-Star
- Nick Swisher (2003) All-Star
- Miguel Tejada (1996) 6× All-Star, 2002 AL MVP
- Mickey Tettleton (1981–1983, 1985–1987) 2× MLB All-Star, 3× Silver Slugger
- Troy Tulowitzki (2005, 2008) 5× All-Star, 2× Gold Glove Award, 2× Silver Slugger
- Lee Walls (1951) All-Star
- Walt Weiss (1985, 1989) All-Star, 1988 AL Rookie of the Year
