= UC Irvine Anteaters baseball =

UC Irvine Anteaters
- 2027 UC Irvine Anteaters baseball team
- Founded: 1970
- University: University of California, Irvine
- Head coach: Ben Orloff (8th season)
- Conference: Big West
- Location: Irvine, California
- Home stadium: Cicerone Field at Anteater Ballpark (capacity: 3,408)
- Nickname: Anteaters
- Colors: Blue and gold

College World Series champions
- Division II: 1973, 1974

College World Series appearances
- 2007, 2014; Division II: 1973, 1974

NCAA regional champions
- 2007, 2008, 2011, 2014; Division II: 1973, 1974

NCAA tournament appearances
- 2004, 2006, 2007, 2008, 2009, 2010, 2011, 2014, 2021, 2024, 2025; Division II: 1970, 1971, 1972, 1973, 1974

Conference regular season champions
- 2009, 2021, 2025

The UC Irvine Anteaters baseball team is the varsity intercollegiate baseball program of the University of California, Irvine. The team's home venue is Cicerone Field at Anteater Ballpark located on campus in Irvine, California. UC Irvine baseball has been a member of the NCAA Division I Big West Conference since the start of the 2002 season which was the Anteaters' first season of play following the university's decision to revive its baseball program following the sport's discontinuation in 1992.

The Anteaters won the College Division national championship in 1973 and the Division II national championship in 1974. Since moving to Division I play they have appeared in the NCAA tournament ten times and the College World Series twice.

== History ==
=== College Division/Division II ===
The program was founded prior to the 1970 season and initially played as an independent school in the NCAA College Division, made up of small-school athletic programs. Under head coach Gary Adams, the team qualified for the College Division Tournament in 1970, 1971, and 1972. In 1973, the team ended the regular season with a twelve-game winning streak and again qualified for the tournament. After advancing to the College Division Championship, it defeated Missouri-St. Louis, Eastern Illinois, and Ithaca twice to win a national championship.

In August 1973, the NCAA reorganized its divisions. Prior to then, the NCAA had competed in two divisions, a large-school University Division and a small-school College Division. Following the reorganization, the University Division became Division I, while the College Division split into Division II and Division III. UC Irvine, formerly an independent in the College Division, became a Division II Independent.

In the first season of Division II, the team again won its regional tournament to advance to the Division II Championship. There, the program defeated New Orleans to win its second consecutive national championship. Following the 1974 season, Gary Adams left UC Irvine to become the head coach at UCLA.

UC Irvine continued to play in Division II until following the 1977 season, though it did not qualify for another NCAA tournament.

=== Transition to Division I ===
Prior to the 1978 season, the program joined the newly formed Division I Southern California Baseball Association (SCBA). Former Gonzaga head coach Steve Hertz became the program's head coach prior to the 1979 season, in which the team finished 7th in the SCBA. In 1980, UC Irvine finished second behind Cal State Fullerton, its best season in the SCBA.

When Steve Hertz returned to Gonzaga following the 1980 season, Mike Gerakos became the program's head coach. The team continued to play in the SCBA, though it finished no higher than third until the conference disbanded following the 1984 season. UC Irvine then became members of the Pacific Coast Athletic Association, which was renamed the Big West Conference prior to the 1987 season. UC Irvine had a winning conference record only twice in eight PCAA/Big West seasons through the end of the 1992 season.

Following the 1992 season, state budget cuts caused the university to cut several sports programs, including baseball. At the time it was discontinued, the program had a 643-565-17 record.

=== Program revival ===
In 2000, the university announced plans to revive the varsity baseball program and build a multimillion-dollar on-campus venue for the program. Following the 2000 college baseball season, the school hired USC assistant John Savage as the program's new head coach. The team began play in 2002. Its first game, also the opening of the newly built Anteater Ballpark, was an 8-5 loss to San Diego on January 25, 2002.

In 2004, the team qualified for the NCAA tournament, its first in Division I. In the South Bend Regional, the team lost consecutive games to Arizona and Notre Dame and was eliminated.

Following the 2004 season, John Savage left the program to become the head coach at UCLA. UC Irvine hired Cal State Fullerton assistant coach Dave Serrano to replace him. In 2006, Serrano's second season, the team qualified for the NCAA tournament. In 2007, the team again qualified for the tournament. After defeating Texas in the Round Rock Regional finals, the Anteaters defeated Wichita State in the Super Regionals to advance to the 2007 College World Series. At the World Series, the team went 2-2 and was eliminated by eventual national champion Oregon State.

Following the 2007 season, Dave Serrano returned to Cal State Fullerton to become the team's head coach. He was replaced by former USC head coach Mike Gillespie. The team qualified for the NCAA tournament in each of Gillespie's first four seasons (2008-2011). In 2008, the team was eliminated by LSU in the Super Regional round. In the team's 2009 season, the Anteaters won the Big West Championship with a 22-2 conference record and qualified for the NCAA tournament as the #6 National Seed. It hosted an NCAA Regional at Anteater Ballpark, but was eliminated in the Regional by Virginia.

Following the 2009 season, Anteater Ballpark was renamed Cicerone Field at Anteater Ballpark for former UC Irvine chancellor Ralph J. Cicerone.

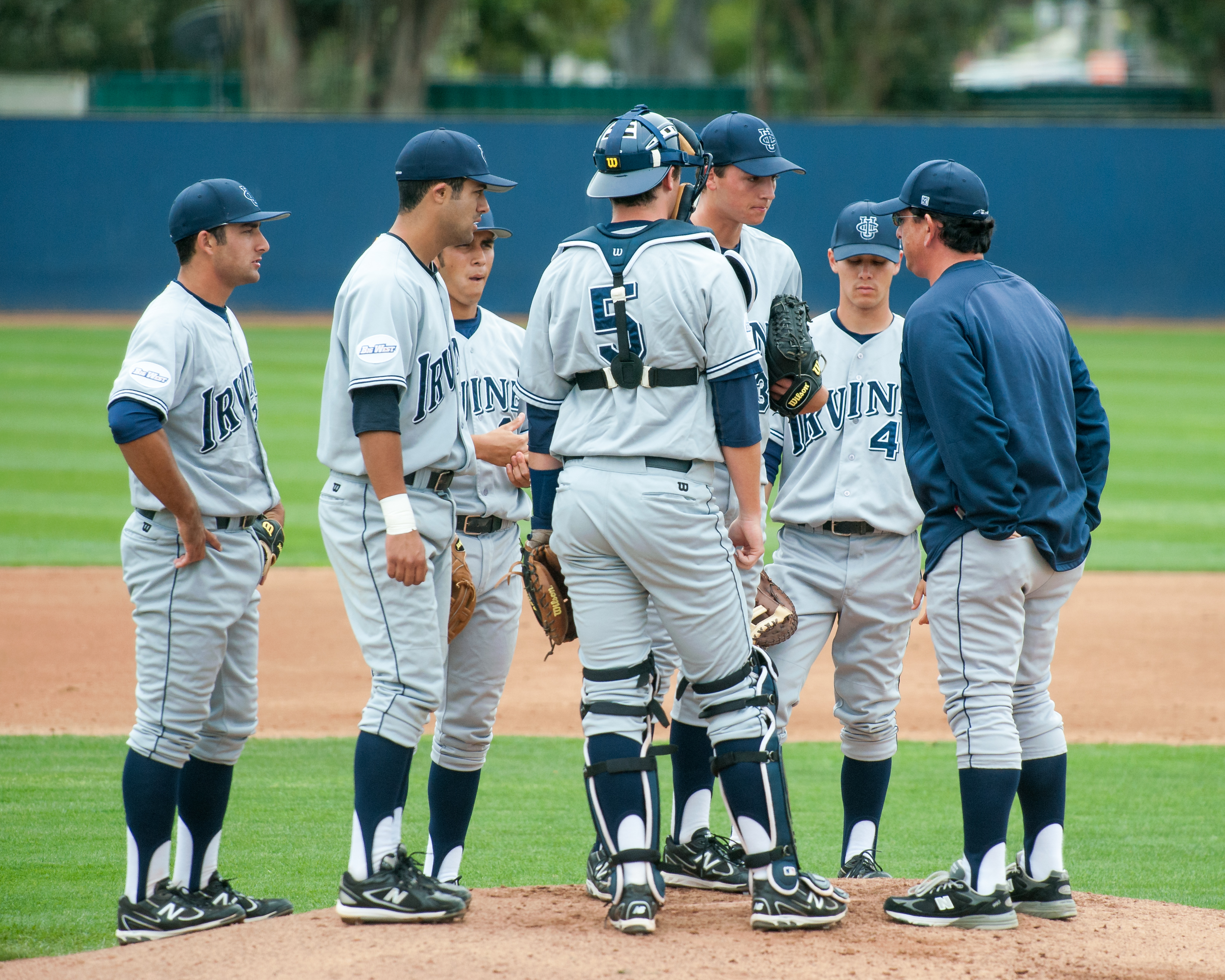
An Anteaters coach conducts a mound visit during a 2010 game at George C. Page Stadium

In 2010, the team qualified for the NCAA tournament but was eliminated in the regional round. In 2011, the team won the Los Angeles Regional to advance to its second super regional under Gillespie. In the super regional, the Anteaters lost to Virginia 2 games to 1.

=== Conference affiliations ===
- Independent (College Division) (1970–1973)
- Independent (Division II) (1974–1977)
- Southern California Baseball Association (1978–1984)
- Big West Conference (1985–1992, 2002–present)
  - Known as the Pacific Coast Athletic Association from 1985–1986

== UC Irvine in the NCAA Tournament ==
Since joining Division I in 1978, the Anteaters have made 11 appearances in the NCAA Division I baseball tournament and qualified for the College World Series in 2007 and 2014.

Year	Record	Pct	Notes
2004	0–2	.000	South Bend Regional
2006	0–2	.000	Malibu Regional
2007	7–2	.778	College World Series 3rd place, Wichita Super Regional Champs
2008	4–2	.667	Baton Rouge Super Regional, Lincoln Regional Champs
2009	2–2	.500	Hosted Irvine Regional
2010	2–2	.500	Los Angeles Regional
2011	4–2	.667	Charlottesville Super Regional, Los Angeles Regional Champs
2014	6–3	.667	College World Series 5th Place, Stillwater Super Regional Champions
2021	3–2	.600	Stanford Regional
2024	2–2	.500	Corvallis Regional
2025	2–2	.500	Los Angeles Regional
TOTALS	32–23	.582	

== Venues ==
=== Cicerone Field at Anteater Ballpark ===
Cicerone Field at Anteater Ballpark has been the program's home venue since it opened in 2002, also the year in which UC Irvine sponsored varsity baseball for the first season since 1992. The venue was known as Anteater Ballpark from 2002-2009, before it was renamed for former university chancellor Ralph J. Cicerone. It has a capacity of 2,900 spectators.

== Head coaches ==
Mike Gerakos, who coached for 12 seasons, is the program's longest tenured coach.

Year(s)	Coach	Seasons	W-L-T	Pct
1970–1974	Gary Adams	5	185–68–5	.731
1975–1976	Tom Spence	2	39–47–1	.453
1977–1978	Eddie Allen	2	47–51–1	.480
1979–1980	Steve Hertz	2	60–51–2	.541
1981–1992	Mike Gerakos	12	312–338–8	.480
2002–2004	John Savage	3	88–84–1	.512
2005–2007	Dave Serrano	3	114–66–1	.633
2008–2018	Mike Gillespie	11	393–249	.612
2019–present	Ben Orloff	8	271–141	.658
Totals	9	47	1,509–1,095–19	.579

== Yearly records ==
Below is a table of the program's yearly records.

Record table
Season	Coach	Overall	Conference	Standing	Postseason
Independent (College Division) (1970–1973)
1970	Gary Adams	33-12-3			NCAA Regional
1971	Gary Adams	27-17-1			NCAA Regional
1972	Gary Adams	33-19-1			NCAA Regional
1973	Gary Adams	44-12			College World Series
College Division Ind.:		137-60-5			
Independent (Division II) (1974–1977)
1974	Gary Adams	48-8			College World Series
1975	Tom Spence	15-27			
1976	Tom Spence	24-20-1			
1977	Eddie Allen	30-23			
Division II Ind.:		117-78-1			
Southern California Baseball Association (Division I) (1978–1984)
1978	Eddie Allen	17-28-1	9-15-1	5th	
1979	Steve Hertz	23-26-1	8-18-1	7th	
1980	Steve Hertz	37-25-1	18-9	2nd	
1981	Mike Gerakos	31-23	13-15	6th	
1982	Mike Gerakos	28-29-1	11-17	6th	
1983	Mike Gerakos	25-25	16-12	3rd	
1984	Mike Gerakos	23-34-1	11-16	6th	
SCBA:		184-190-5	86-102		
Pacific Coast Athletic Association/Big West Conference (1985–1992)
1985	Mike Gerakos	27-28-1	14-13	3rd (South)	
1986	Mike Gerakos	20-26-2	9-12	5th	
1987	Mike Gerakos	27-26-1	13-8	2nd	
1988	Mike Gerakos	30-28-1	9-12	t-5th	
1989	Mike Gerakos	20-35-1	6-15	7th	
1990	Mike Gerakos	34-25	10-11	t-5th	
1991	Mike Gerakos	24-32	6-15	8th	
1992	Mike Gerakos	23-27	10-14	6th	
No program (1993–2001)
Big West Conference (2002–present)
2002	John Savage	33-26	14-10	t-4th	
2003	John Savage	21-35	8-14	t-5th	
2004	John Savage	34-23-1	10-11	6th	NCAA Regional
2005	Dave Serrano	31-25	10-11	5th	
2006	Dave Serrano	36-24	11-10	3rd	NCAA Regional
2007	Dave Serrano	47-17-1	15-6	t-2nd	College World Series
2008	Mike Gillespie	42-18	14-10	t-3rd	NCAA Super Regional
2009	Mike Gillespie	45-15	22-2	1st	NCAA Regional (#6 National Seed)
2010	Mike Gillespie	39-21	17-7	2nd	NCAA Regional
2011	Mike Gillespie	43-18	16-8	2nd	NCAA Super Regional
2012	Mike Gillespie	31-25	13-11	4th	
2013	Mike Gillespie	33-22	15-12	t-4th	
2014	Mike Gillespie	41-25	15-9	3rd	College World Series
2015	Mike Gillespie	33-23	15-9	3rd	
2016	Mike Gillespie	31-25	11-13	8th	
2017	Mike Gillespie	23-33	9-15	7th	
2018	Mike Gillespie	32–24	13–11	3rd	
2019	Ben Orloff	37–17	17–7	2nd	
2020	Ben Orloff	8–7	8–7	7th	
2021	Ben Orloff	43–18	32–8	1st	NCAA Regional
2022	Ben Orloff	32–24	16–14	6th	
2023	Ben Orloff	38–17	19–11	4th	
2024	Ben Orloff	45–14	22–8	2nd	NCAA Regional
2025	Ben Orloff	43–17	24–6	1st	NCAA Regional
2026	Ben Orloff	25–27	14–16	4th	
2027	Ben Orloff	0–0	0–0	—	
PCAA/Big West:		1,071–767–8	468–357		
Total:		1,509–1,095–19			
National champion Postseason invitational champion Conference regular season champion Conference regular season and conference tournament champion Division regular season champion Division regular season and conference tournament champion Conference tournament champion

== Notable former players ==
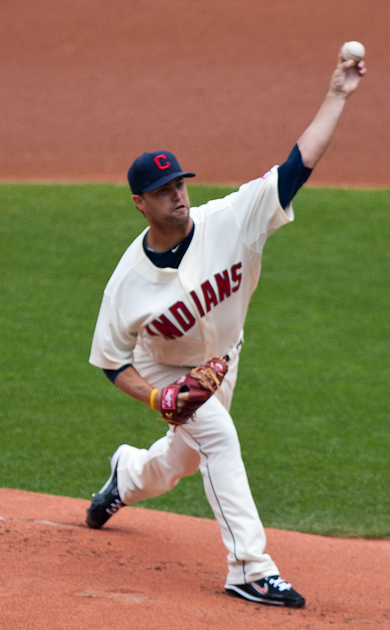
David Huff, shown while pitching for the MLB's Cleveland Indians.

Below is a list of notable former Anteaters and the seasons in which they played for the program.

- Brady Anderson (1983-1985)
- Garrett Atkins
- Dylan Axelrod (2006-2007)
- Justin Cassel (2004-2006)
- Keston Hiura (2015-2017)
- David Huff (2004)
- Christian Koss (2017–2019)
- Doug Linton (1984-1986)
- Ben Orloff (2006-2009)
- Andre Pallante
- Bryan Petersen (2005-2007)
- Sean Tracey (2002)
- Gary Wheelock (1972-1974)
