= 2027 Cal State Fullerton Titans baseball team =

American college baseball season

2027 Cal State Fullerton Titans baseball
- Conference: Big West Conference
- Record: 0–0 (0–0 Big West)
- Head coach: Cory Vanderhook (interim) (1st season)
- Assistant coaches: Neil Walton; Josh Belovsky; Ryan Day
- Home stadium: Goodwin Field

2027 Big West Conference baseball standings
	Conf.				Overall
Team	W		L	PCT	W		L	PCT
California Baptist ‍‍‍	0	–	0	–	0	–	0	–
Cal Poly ‍‍‍	0	–	0	–	0	–	0	–
Cal State Bakersfield ‍‍‍	0	–	0	–	0	–	0	–
Cal State Fullerton ‍‍‍	0	–	0	–	0	–	0	–
Cal State Northridge ‍‍‍	0	–	0	–	0	–	0	–
Long Beach State ‍‍‍	0	–	0	–	0	–	0	–
Sacramento State ‍‍‍	0	–	0	–	0	–	0	–
UC Irvine ‍‍‍	0	–	0	–	0	–	0	–
UC Riverside ‍‍‍	0	–	0	–	0	–	0	–
UC San Diego ‍‍‍	0	–	0	–	0	–	0	–
UC Santa Barbara ‍‍‍	0	–	0	–	0	–	0	–
Utah Valley ‍‍‍	0	–	0	–	0	–	0	–
† – Conference champion ‡ – Tournament champion y – Invited to the NCAA tournament As of November 12, 2026; Rankings from D1Baseball

The 2027 Cal State Fullerton Titans baseball team will represent California State University, Fullerton during the 2027 NCAA Division I baseball season. The Titans will play their home games at Goodwin Field in Fullerton, California, as a member of the Big West Conference (BWC), and will be led by first-year head coach Cory Vanderhook.

== Previous season ==
The Titans ended the 2026 season with a record of 15–15 in conference play and 24–32 overall record, good for fifth place in the Big West. They would qualify for the Big West Tournament as they would be the 5th seed, they would beat fourth seed Hawaii 5–1 in Round 1, but would lose to top seed UC Santa Barbara 7–4 in the Upper Round 2 and UC San Diego 5–1 in the Lower Round 2 ending their tournament. As well as they would not get an invitation to the NCAA Tournament.

== Roster ==
2027 Cal State Fullerton Titans roster
Pitchers	Catchers Infielders	Outfielders	Two Way Players

=== Coaches ===
2027 Cal State Fullerton Titans baseball coaching staff
- Cory Vanderhook (interim) – Head coach – 1st season

Note: Season counter accounts for all stints at Cal State Fullerton.

== Personnel ==
=== Starters ===
Opening Night Lineup
Pos.	No.	Player.	Year
--	--	--	--
--	--	--	--
--	--	--	--
--	--	--	--
--	--	--	--
--	--	--	--
--	--	--	--
--	--	--	--
--	--	--	--

Weekend pitching rotation
Day	No.	Player.	Year
Friday	--	--	--
Saturday	--	--	--
Sunday	--	--	--

== Schedule and results ==
2027 Cal State Fullerton Titans baseball game log (Overall: 0–0; Conference: 0–0); (Home: 0–0; Away: 0–0; Neutral: 0–0)
Regular season (0–0)
February (0–0)
(Home; 0–0; Away: 0–0)

Date	Time (PST)	Opponent	Rank	TV	Venue	Score	Win	Loss	Save	Attendance	Overall record	BWC record

March (0–0)
(Home; 0–0; Away: 0–0)

Date	Time (PST)	Opponent	Rank	TV	Venue	Score	Win	Loss	Save	Attendance	Overall record	BWC record

April (0–0)
(Home; 0–0; Away: 0–0)

Date	Time (PST)	Opponent	Rank	TV	Venue	Score	Win	Loss	Save	Attendance	Overall record	BWC record

May (0–0)
(Home: 0–0; Away: 0–0)

Date	Time (PST)	Opponent	Rank	TV	Venue	Score	Win	Loss	Save	Attendance	Overall record	BWC record

"#" represents ranking. All rankings from D1 Baseball Poll on the date of the contest.
"()" represents postseason seeding in the Big Ten Tournament or NCAA Regional, respectively.
= Win, = Loss, = Canceled/Postponed
Bold = **Cal State Fullerton Titans team member**
* = Non-Conference Game
Schedule Source:

== Rankings ==
Ranking movements
	Week																	
Poll	Pre	1	2	3	4	5	6	7	8	9	10	11	12	13	14	15	16	Final
Coaches'		*																
Baseball America																		
NCBWA†																		

† NCBWA ranks 30 teams in their preseason poll, but only ranks 25 teams weekly during the season.
* A new poll was not released for this week, so for comparison purposes, the previous week's ranking is inserted in this week's slot.
