= Ontario Tower Buzzers =

- Founded in 2026; Ontario, California

| Team logo | Cap insignia |

Minor league affiliations
- Class: Single-A (2026–present)
- League: California League (2026–present)
- Division: South Division

Major league affiliations
- Team: Los Angeles Dodgers (2026–present)

Minor league titles
- Second-half titles (1): 2026

Team data
- Colors: Dodger blue, sky blue, red, yellow, white
- Mascot: Maverick
- Ballpark: ONT Field (2026–present)
- Owner/ Operator: Diamond Baseball Holdings
- President: TBD
- General manager: Allan Benavides
- Manager: John Shoemaker
- Website: milb.com/team/ontario

The Ontario Tower Buzzers are a Minor League Baseball team based in Ontario, California. The Tower Buzzers are the Single-A affiliate of the Los Angeles Dodgers, playing in the California League. They play their home games at ONT Field.

== History ==
The origins of the Ontario Tower Buzzers reach back to the Rancho Cucamonga Quakes, the longtime Single-A affiliate of the Los Angeles Dodgers. The Rancho Cucamonga California League franchise was relocated to the Ontario Ranch section of Ontario, California, to play at ONT Field, a new 6,000-seat ballpark, as the Ontario Tower Buzzers. The name and visual identity were publicly revealed at a launch event in Ontario Town Square in mid-September 2025.

This move was one in a series of changes involving three teams. The Inland Empire 66ers of San Bernardino relocated to Rancho Cucamonga to play as the Quakes in affiliation with the Los Angeles Angels. Additionally, the Modesto Nuts relocated to San Bernardino to continue as the 66ers in affiliation with the Seattle Mariners. In effect, it made the move a de facto relocation of the Nuts franchise, rather than the Quakes franchise. Diamond Baseball Holdings owns all three teams as well as two other clubs in the eight-team California League.

=== Ownership and management ===
The team is owned and operated by Diamond Baseball Holdings, which manages a portfolio of Minor League Baseball teams across the United States. Team management announced Allan Benavides as general manager, joining the organization after a long tenure with other minor-league clubs.

== Branding and mascot ==
The Tower Buzzers' name and branding draw inspiration from Ontario's aviation heritage and its proximity to Ontario International Airport as well as the quote from the 1986 film Top Gun where Maverick states to "buzz the tower", or fly very close to the control tower. The club's logo and marketing lean heavily into aviation iconography, with the primary mascot—a bee in aviator gear named Maverick—and uniform elements referencing flight and air-traffic control motifs. The moniker was chosen to celebrate the "buzz" of the airport and region, rather than to imitate more common aviation nicknames, such as "Aviators" or "Pilots."

== Ballpark ==
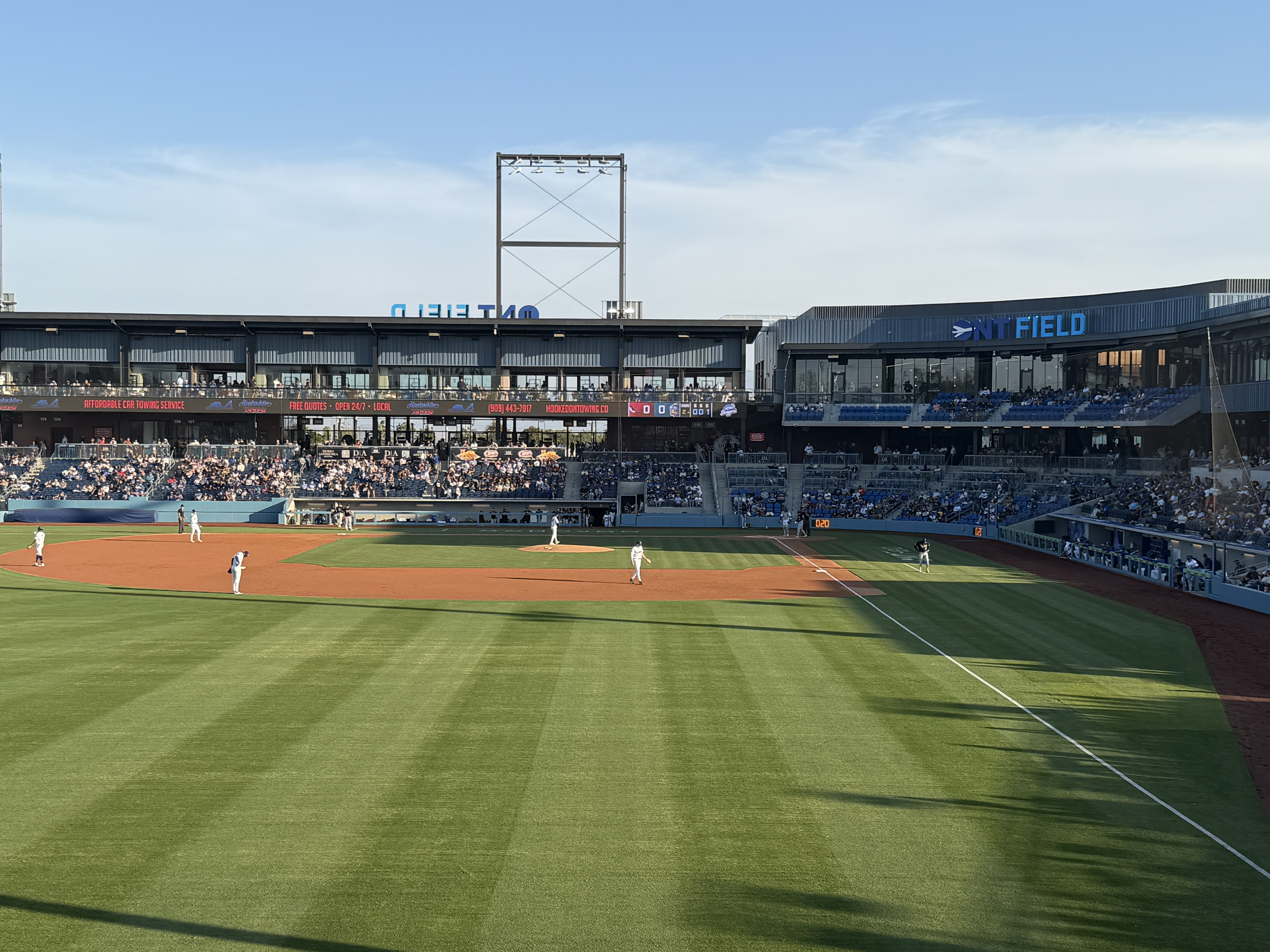
View of ONT Field from left field

The Tower Buzzers home ballpark is ONT Field. Their first home game was played on April 2, 2026, against the Lake Elsinore Storm.

== Roster ==
Ontario Tower Buzzers roster
| Players | Coaches/Other |
|---|---|
| Pitchers: 99 Javier Bartolozzi; 00 Devin Bell; 21 Jose Cabrera; 52 Luis Carias; 17 Joel Cruz; 55 Mason Estrada; 38 Will Gagnon; 30 Domingo Geronimo; 49 Luis Gamez; 56 Jholbran Herder; 78 Jecsua Liborius; 77 Logan Lunceford; 45 Ian May; 44 Accimias Morales; 53 Marlon Nieves; 37 Jack O'Connor; 38 Brady Pendley; 46 Jesus Tillero; 47 Jose Vasquez; 81 Charlie West; 25 Camden Wimbish; Catchers: 77 Francisco Espinoza; 6 Abel Lorenzo; 35 Connor O'Neal; Infielders: 30 Bryan Gonzalez Garcia; 7 Javier Herrera; 3 Caleb Johnson; 15 Kellon Lindsey; 65 Oswaldo Osorio; 28 Easton Shelton; 9 Joendry Vargas; 88 Aidan West; Outfielders: 36 Ching-Hsien Ko; 25 AJ Soldra; 27 Brendan Tunink | Manager: 12 John Shoemaker; Coaches: -- Michael Charters (development); 40 Johermyn Chavez (hitting); -- Sean Coyne (pitching); -- Jeremy Gaines (outfield & baserunning); -- Jose Gutierrez (performance); -- Ezra Lacina (bullpen catcher); -- Luis Vasquez (pitching); 48 Dunior Zerpa (bench); 60-day injured list: 31 Dailoui Abad; -- Davion Hickson; 81 Ricardo Montero; 51 Dylan Tate; 7-day injured list; * On Los Angeles Dodgers 40-man roster; ~ Development list; # Rehab assignment; ∞ Reserve list; ‡ Restricted list; § Suspended list; † Temporarily inactive list; Roster updated August 20, 2026; Transactions; → More rosters: MiLB • California League; → Los Angeles Dodgers minor league players |
