= Steve Hertz (baseball coach) =

American former college baseball coach (born 1950)

Biographical details
- Born: October 3, 1950 (age 75); Glendale, California, U.S.

Playing career
- 1969: Los Angeles Pierce
- 1970–1972: Gonzaga
- Position: Pitcher

Coaching career (HC unless noted)
- 1976–1977: Gonzaga (asst.)
- 1978: Gonzaga
- 1979–1980: UC Irvine
- 1981–2003: Gonzaga

Head coaching record
- Overall: 695–690–9 (.502)
- Tournaments: NCAA: 2–4 (.333)

Accomplishments and honors

Championships
- 2× Northern Pacific regular season (1978, 1981); WCC Coast Division (2001)

Awards
- 2× Northern Pacific Coach of the Year (1978, 1981); SCBA Coach of the Year (1980); Pac-10 Northern Division Coach of the Year (1994); WCC Coach of the Year (2001)

Stephen Lawrence Hertz (born October 3, 1950) is an American former college baseball coach. He was the head coach of the Gonzaga Bulldogs in 1978 before holding the same position at UC Irvine from 1979 to 1980. Hertz returned to Gonzaga prior to the 1981 season and coached there through the 2003 season. Under Hertz, Gonzaga appeared in two NCAA tournaments (1978 and 1981), six Pac-10 Northern Division Tournaments (1986–1991), and one West Coast Conference Championship Series (2001). His career head coaching record was 697–678–5 (.507).

Born and raised in southern California, he graduated from Taft High School, then played college baseball at Los Angeles Pierce College and Gonzaga. A third baseman in high school, Hertz became a pitcher in college; signed by the Minnesota Twins in 1972, he played three seasons of minor league baseball (1972–1974).

In April 2007, a bronze bust of Hertz was unveiled at the Bulldogs' new ballpark, Washington Trust Field and Patterson Baseball Complex.

== Head coaching record ==
The following is a table of Hertz's yearly records as an NCAA head baseball coach.

Statistics overview
Season	Team	Overall	Conference	Standing	Postseason
Gonzaga Bulldogs (Northern Pacific Conference) (1978)
1978	Gonzaga	33-14–1	18-6	1st	NCAA Regional
UC Irvine Anteaters (Southern California Baseball Association) (1979–1980)
1979	UC Irvine	22–37–1	9–19–1	7th	
1980	UC Irvine	37–25–1	18–9	2nd	
UC Irvine:		59–62–2 (.488)	27–28–1 (.491)		
Gonzaga Bulldogs (Northern Pacific Conference) (1981)
1981	Gonzaga	48–21	25–7	1st	NCAA Regional
Gonzaga Bulldogs (Pacific-10 Conference) (1982–1995)
1982	Gonzaga	30–28	10–14	5th (Northern)	
1983	Gonzaga	17–34	6–18	7th (Northern)	
1984	Gonzaga	23–29–1	6–14	6th (Northern)	
1985	Gonzaga	26–23–1	11–13	5th (Northern)	
1986	Gonzaga	30–21	13–10	2nd (Northern)	
1987	Gonzaga	20–32	8–16	6th (Northern)	
1988	Gonzaga	28–28	12–11	4th (Northern)	
1989	Gonzaga	27–19	15–9	T–2nd (Northern)	
1990	Gonzaga	37–21	13–11	4th (Northern)	
1991	Gonzaga	23–25	8–12	T–4th (Northern)	
1992	Gonzaga	22–30	14–16	5th (Northern)	
1993	Gonzaga	17–36	9–21	5th (Northern)	
1994	Gonzaga	29–23	14–16	5th (Northern)	
1995	Gonzaga	29–25	15–15	3rd (Northern)	
Gonzaga Bulldogs (West Coast Conference) (1996–2003)
1996	Gonzaga	24–25	12–15	5th	
1997	Gonzaga	19–33–1	7–21	8th	
1998	Gonzaga	16–34	10–20	6th	
1999	Gonzaga	27–23–2	14–14	2nd (West)	
2000	Gonzaga	28–25	17–13	2nd (Coast)	
2001	Gonzaga	28–27	17–13	1st (Coast)	
2002	Gonzaga	27–29	14–16	4th (Coast)	
2003	Gonzaga	26–25–1	14–16	3rd (Coast)	
Gonzaga:		636–628–7 (.503)	284–331 (.462)		
Total:		695–690–9 (.502)			
National champion Postseason invitational champion Conference regular season champion Conference regular season and conference tournament champion Division regular season champion Division regular season and conference tournament champion Conference tournament champion
