= Larry Koentopp =

American basketball coach (1936–2019)

Koentopp

Larry Koentopp (November 17, 1936 – January 12, 2019) was a college baseball head coach and Minor League Baseball executive. He was born in Spokane, Washington.

Koentopp is best known as the man responsible for bringing Triple-A Professional Baseball to Las Vegas, Nevada in 1983. He also served as the baseball coach and athletic director of Gonzaga University from 1970 through 1977.

Koentopp was a three-sport all-state selection at Gonzaga Preparatory School. He then attended Gonzaga University where he was a standout baseball and basketball player, though he never pursued a professional playing career.

Upon graduation, Koentopp taught and coached in the Southern California school system, before returning to Gonzaga University. As baseball coach of the Bulldogs, his teams posted a 289-138 record, winning three Big Sky Conference titles in 1971 and from 1973-74, as well as one Northern Pacific Conference Championship in 1976. Five of his players went to the major leagues: Mike Davey, Tom Gorman, Casey Parsons, Lenn Sakata and Rick Sweet. He left Gonzaga in 1977.

Following a year off, Koentopp led a group of 13 local investors who purchased the Spokane Indians in September 1979. He took over the role of general manager. Spokane, then an affiliate of the Seattle Mariners and member of the Class AAA Pacific Coast League, ran into financial difficulties in the 1980 season due to the rain and ash fall from the Mount St. Helens eruption, which led the Indians to cancel 18 of their home games and having to deal with poor attendance throughout the rest of the year.

Soon after that season, Koentopp moved the franchise to Las Vegas and renamed it Las Vegas Stars, bringing the city its first-ever Triple-A base-ball franchise in 1983. The Stars’ glory years came during the 1980s when the San Diego Padres’ farm system was stocked with future Major League All-Stars. The team won the PCL championship in 1986 and 1988, twice defeating the Vancouver Canadians. The 1983 Stars, who had an 80-62 record, were inducted into the Southern Nevada Sports Hall of Fame in 2007. The Stars also were the recipient of the 1985 John H. Johnson President's Award, given to the franchise for Outstanding Club Operation.

Koentopp sold the team, which was renamed the 51s in 2001, to Mandalay Sports Entertainment before the 1993 season. Since making their PCL debut in 1983, the Vegas franchise attracted 12,001,011 spectators until 2018, their last year at Cashman Field. The Aviators new name officially went into effect before the 2019 season, while moving to its new Las Vegas Ballpark.

Through his life, Koentopp was funny and clever and possessed a great deal of energy, going always on the go. He worked out at the gym on a daily basis and golf was one of his favorite pastimes. After selling the team, he remained in Las Vegas, where he died in 2019 at the age of 82.
