= Mark Machtolf =

American baseball coach (born 1964)

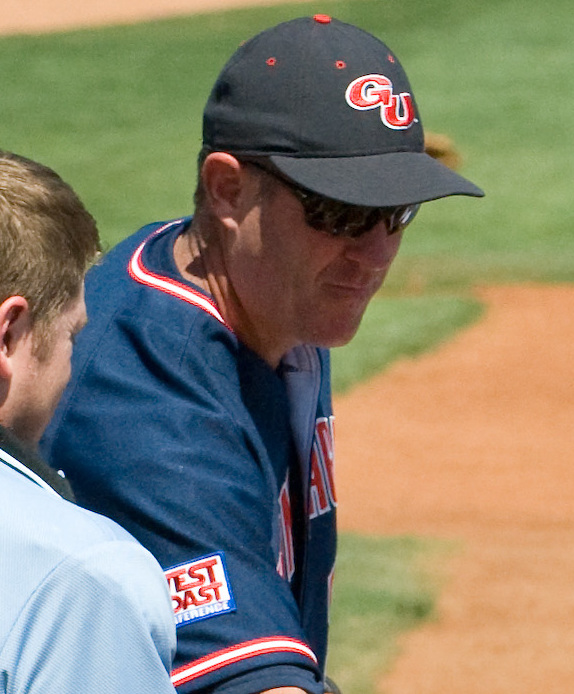
- Machtolf in 2008

Current position
- Title: Head coach
- Team: Gonzaga
- Conference: Pac-12
- Record: 656–543–2 (.547)

Biographical details
- Born: October 31, 1964 (age 62); Spokane, Washington, U.S.

Playing career
- 1984–1987: Stanford
- Position: Designated hitter

Coaching career (HC unless noted)
- 1988–1990: Gonzaga (asst.)
- 1991: Whitworth (asst.)
- 1992–1995: Gonzaga Prep
- 1996–2003: Gonzaga (asst.)
- 2004–present: Gonzaga

Head coaching record
- Overall: 656–543–2 (.547)
- Tournaments: NCAA: 4–8 (.333)

Accomplishments and honors

Championships
- 2× WCC tournament (2009, 2018); 7× WCC regular season (2009, 2013, 2016, 2017, 2021, 2022, 2026)

Awards
- 6× WCC Coach of the Year (2009, 2013, 2017, 2021, 2022, 2026)

Mark Andrew Machtolf (born October 31, 1964) is an American college baseball coach, the head coach of the Gonzaga Bulldogs of the Pac-12 Conference. He succeeded Steve Hertz, who retired after the 2003 season, after 23 years at the helm. Machtolf was an assistant to Hertz for the previous eight seasons (1996–2003). Under Machtolf, Gonzaga has made three NCAA tournament appearances (2009, 2016, 2018). As a result of Gonzaga's successful season in 2009, Machtolf was named the WCC Coach of the Year.

Machtolf graduated from Gonzaga Prep in 1983 and Stanford University in 1987. A three-sport star in high school, he played college baseball for the Stanford Cardinal from 1984–1987. In his senior season of 1987, the Cardinal won the national title and he was named to the All-College World Series Team as a designated hitter. He also played college football at Stanford in 1983 and 1984.

== Head coaching record ==
Below is a table of Machtolf's yearly records as an NCAA head baseball coach.

Record table
Season	Team	Overall	Conference	Standing	Postseason
Gonzaga Bulldogs (West Coast Conference) (2004–present)
2004	Gonzaga	24–27	16–11	3rd (Coast)	
2005	Gonzaga	28–26	15–15	3rd (Coast)	
2006	Gonzaga	29–24	9–12	5th	
2007	Gonzaga	33–25	15–6	2nd	
2008	Gonzaga	30–23	10–10	5th	
2009	Gonzaga	36–18	14–7	1st	NCAA Regional
2010	Gonzaga	20–36	8–13	T–5th	
2011	Gonzaga	32–19–1	15–6	2nd	
2012	Gonzaga	34–22	14–10	T–3rd	
2013	Gonzaga	32–21	18–6	1st	
2014	Gonzaga	26–29	17–10	T–2nd	
2015	Gonzaga	24–28	13–14	T–6th	
2016	Gonzaga	36–21	18–9	T–1st	NCAA Regional
2017	Gonzaga	33–20	20–7	T–1st	
2018	Gonzaga	33–23	16–11	2nd	NCAA Regional
2019	Gonzaga	31–24	18–9	2nd	
2020	Gonzaga	6–10	0–0		Season canceled due to COVID-19
2021	Gonzaga	34–19	20–7	1st	NCAA Regional
2022	Gonzaga	35–15	20–7	1st	
2023	Gonzaga	18–34	14–13	T–5th	
2024	Gonzaga	21–32	14–10	4th	WCC tournament
2025	Gonzaga	26–27	16–8	2nd	WCC tournament
2026	Gonzaga	35–19	22–5	1st	WCC tournament
Gonzaga:		656–543–2 (.547)	342–206 (.624)		
Total:		656–543–2 (.547)			
National champion Postseason invitational champion Conference regular season champion Conference regular season and conference tournament champion Division regular season champion Division regular season and conference tournament champion Conference tournament champion

== See also ==
- List of current NCAA Division I baseball coaches
