= Gonzaga Bulldogs baseball =

Gonzaga Bulldogs
- 2026 Gonzaga Bulldogs baseball team
- Founded: 1890
- University: Gonzaga University
- Head coach: Mark Machtolf (23rd season)
- Conference: Pac-12
- Location: Spokane, Washington
- Home stadium: Washington Trust Field and Patterson Baseball Complex (capacity: 1,300)
- Nickname: Bulldogs
- Colors: Navy blue, white, and red

NCAA tournament appearances
- 1971, 1973, 1974, 1976, 1978, 1980, 1981, 2009, 2016, 2018, 2021, 2022

Conference tournament champions
- Big Sky: 1971, 1973, 1974; WCC: 2009, 2018

Conference regular season champions
- Big Sky: 1965, 1971, 1973, 1974; Nor-Pac: 1976, 1978, 1980, 1981; WCC: 2009, 2013, 2016, 2018, 2021, 2022, 2026

The Gonzaga Bulldogs baseball team is the varsity intercollegiate baseball program of Gonzaga University, located in Spokane, Washington, United States. The NCAA Division I program has been a member of the Pac-12 Conference since 2026 and its home venue is Washington Trust Field and Patterson Baseball Complex, opened on Gonzaga's campus in 2007. After the 2026 season, Gonzaga will leave the WCC (Note: Gonzaga has been a WCC member since 1979 (1980 baseball season), but did not join WCC baseball until the 1996 season.) for the Pac-12 Conference.

Mark Machtolf has been the program's head coach since 2004. Through 2013, Gonzaga has appeared in eight NCAA tournaments. It has won four conference championship series, seven regular season conference championships, and five regular season division titles. Gonzaga was formerly an affiliate member of the Pac-10 conference for baseball and previously played in the NorPac and Big Sky conferences.

As of the start of the 2013 season, 16 former Bulldogs have played in Major League Baseball.

== History ==
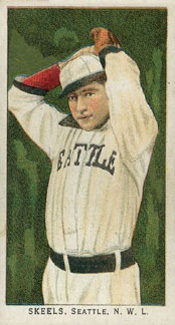
Dave Skeels in 1911

Gonzaga College was founded in September 1887, and the first recorded game of the baseball program was held shortly thereafter, in 1890. On September 14, 1910, Dave Skeels became the first Gonzaga player to appear in the major leagues when he pitched in a game for the Detroit Tigers. In 1912, the college was recognized by the state of Washington as a university and was renamed Gonzaga University. Although the team competed in the first half of the 20th century, comprehensive records of its play do not exist prior to the 1960 season, when the team competed as an independent school in District VII of the NCAA's University Division.

=== Big Sky ===
Gonzaga was a charter member of the Big Sky Conference, which launched in the summer of 1963 with six schools. Its first baseball season was in 1964, and the Bulldogs won the conference title in 1965. Prior to the 1967 season, the program opened Pecarovich Field, named for former Gonzaga football head coach Mike Pecarovich.

Larry Koentopp was named head coach prior to the 1970 season, and the Big Sky expanded to eight teams that summer. For baseball, the conference split into two-four team divisions for the 1971 season, and Gonzaga won all won four Northern division titles from 1971 through 1974. The Zags won the Big Sky championship series in three of those four seasons, which earned a berth in the NCAA tournament in 1971, 1973, and 1974. The 1972 team entered the Big Sky tournament on a 28-game winning streak, but was the first team eliminated. It was the only year the Big Sky used a four-team format; the other three seasons had a best-of-three series between the division winners.

=== Northern Pacific ===
Following the 1974 season, the Big Sky discontinued sponsorship of five of its ten sports, including baseball. Along with Idaho and Boise State, the program joined the new seven-team Northern Pacific Conference (NorPac) in June 1974. The Bulldogs were second in 1975, but won four conference championships in the next six seasons to advance to the NCAA tournament in 1976, 1978, 1980, and 1981. After Idaho and Boise State dropped baseball following the 1980 season, the NorPac played a final season with five teams in 1981.

=== Pacific-10 ===
The four remaining NorPac programs (Gonzaga, Eastern Washington, Portland State, and Portland) moved to the Pacific-10 Conference (Pac-10) for the 1982 season, into the Northern Division with Washington, Washington State, and Oregon State. (Oregon dropped baseball after the 1981 season; it returned in 2009.)

Gonzaga remained an affiliate member of the Pac-10 for baseball through the 1995 season, but never finished higher than runner-up in the North. The Bulldogs appeared in the division tournament six times (1986–1991) and hosted it from 1986 to 1989.

=== West Coast Conference ===
Following the 1995 season, the program moved to the West Coast Conference (WCC), which the majority of the school's athletic programs had joined in the summer of 1979. Also following the 1995 season, Pecarovich Field was renamed August/A.R.T. Stadium.

Gonzaga initially struggled in WCC baseball, finishing fifth, eighth, and sixth in its first three seasons. However, after the WCC split into two four-team divisions prior to the 1999 season, Gonzaga finished second in its division in 1999 and 2000 and won the Coast Division in 2001. In the best-of-three 2001 WCC Championship Series, Gonzaga lost to Pepperdine 2–1.

During the 2003 season, August/A.R.T. Stadium was razed to allow for the construction of the McCarthey Athletic Center. The team used Spokane's Avista Stadium until its current venue, Washington Trust Field and Patterson Baseball Complex, was completed prior to the 2007 season.

Following the 2003 season, Steve Hertz retired after 24 seasons as the program's head coach, and was replaced by Mark Machtolf. Under Machtolf, the team qualified for three WCC Championship Series (2007, 2009, 2011). After losing to San Diego in 2007, Gonzaga defeated Loyola Marymount in 2009 to qualify for the program's first NCAA tournament since 1981. In the Fullerton Regional, the team defeated Georgia Southern in its first game, but it lost consecutive games to Cal State Fullerton and Utah and was eliminated. In the 2011 WCC Championship Series, Gonzaga lost to San Francisco.

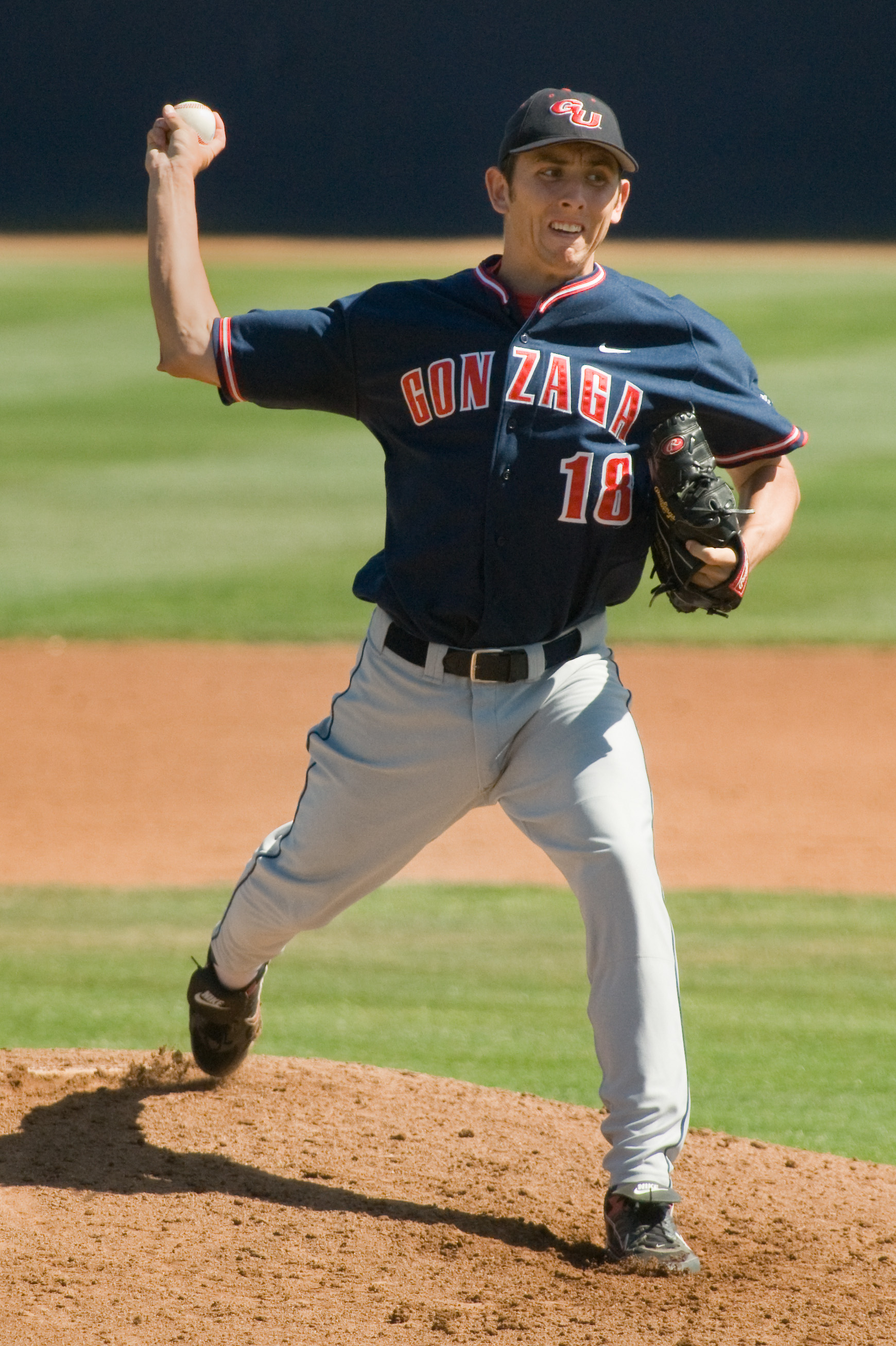
A Bulldogs pitcher (Mark Fields) during a game at George C. Page Stadium in 2008

In 2016, as a sophomore future major leaguer Eli Morgan was 10–3 with a 3.73 ERA in 16 starts, earning him a spot on the All-West Coast Conference (WCC) First Team. His 10 wins tied him for second-most in the WCC, and his 3 shutouts led the conference. In 2017, his junior season, Morgan compiled a 10–2 record with a 2.86 ERA in 14 starts, during which he struck out a conference-leading 138 batters (second-most in school history) in 100.2 innings (12.3 strikeouts/9 innings), and was once again named to the All-WCC First Team. His 10 wins again tied him for second-most in the WCC, and he tied for the conference lead with two shutouts. He was one of four pitchers in the country with more than one 15-strikeout games. He was also named Perfect Game/Rawlings First Team All-American, Collegiate Baseball Second Team All-American, three-time National Player of the Week, and five-time Rawlings WCC Pitcher of the Week.

=== Conference affiliations ===
Dates reflect baseball seasons, which take place in the calendar year after a conference change takes effect.

- Independent (?–1963)
- Big Sky Conference (1964–1974)
- Northern Pacific Conference (NorPac) (1975–1981)
- Pacific-10 Conference (1982–1995) affiliate member
- West Coast Conference (1996–2026)
- Pac-12 Conference (2027–future)

== Gonzaga in the NCAA tournament ==
Year	Record	Pct	Notes
1971	1–2	.333	District 7
1973	1–2	.333	District 7
1974	1–2	.333	District 7
1976	0–2	.000	Rocky Mountain Regional
1978	2–2	.500	Rocky Mountain Regional
1980	2–2	.500	West Regional
1981	0–2	.000	West Regional
2009	1–2	.333	Fullerton Regional
2016	1–2	.333	Fort Worth Regional
2018	1–2	.333	Minneapolis Regional
2021	1–2	.333	Eugene Regional
2022	1–2	.333	Blacksburg Regional
TOTALS	12-24	.333	

== Venues ==
=== Early venues ===
The earliest known venue of the program is Underhill Park, located off-campus across the Spokane River. Underhill still functions as a municipal park in Spokane. The team moved from Underhill to its first on-campus home, located in Gonzaga's upper campus, where it played until after the 1966 season.

=== August/A.R.T. Stadium ===
From 1967 into the 2003 season, the program played at August/A.R.T. Stadium, which had a capacity of 1,000. The ballpark opened in 1967 as Pecarovich Field, named for former Gonzaga football player and coach Mike Pecarovich (1898–1965). Gonzaga swept a doubleheader against Central Washington on April 7 to open the field.

Prior to the 1996 season, the venue was renamed August/A.R.T. Stadium, and Gonzaga used it into the 2003 season; it was demolished and the McCarthey Athletic Center was built on the site. In the stadium's last game on April 13, Gonzaga lost to San Francisco 8–3. The remainder of the home schedule in 2003 was played at Spokane Falls Community College.

=== Avista Stadium ===
For three seasons (2004–2006), Gonzaga played at Avista Stadium, the home venue of the minor league Spokane Indians. Opened in 1958 as a Triple-A ballpark, it has a capacity of 7,162 spectators.

=== Washington Trust Field and Patterson Baseball Complex ===
At the start of the 2007 season, the program opened its current venue, Washington Trust Field and Patterson Baseball Complex. In the home opener on March 15, Gonzaga defeated Rider 9–4. It was dedicated a month later on April 20, named for Washington Trust Bank, a donor to the field's construction, and Michael Patterson, a Gonzaga alumnus. It has a capacity of 1,500 spectators.

== Head coaches ==
Steve Hertz is the winningest and longest-tenured head coach in Gonzaga athletics history; in 24 seasons (1978, 1981–2003) at the helm, he recorded 637 wins.

Year(s)	Coach	Seasons	W–L–T	Pct
1960–1961	Joe Schauble	2	6–26	.186
1962–1967	Dick Busch	6	72–85–1	.459
1968–1969	Joey August	2	28–38	.424
1970–1977	Larry Koentopp	8	289–138	.677
1978, 1981–2003	Steve Hertz	24	637–630–6	.504
1979–1980	Jim Lawler	2	64–32	.667
2004–present	Mark Machtolf	21	595–497–2	.545
Totals	7	65	1691–1446–8	.539

== Yearly records ==
Below is a table of the program's yearly records.

Record table
Season	Coach	Overall	Conference	Standing	Postseason
District VII Independent (1960–1963)
1960	Joe Schauble	3–13			
1961	Joe Schauble	3–13			
1962	Dick Busch	10–12			
1963	Dick Busch	10–11			
District VII Independent:		26–49			
Big Sky Conference (1964–1974)
1964	Dick Busch	7–18–1	1–5	t-2nd (Northern)	
1965	Dick Busch	19–10	9–3	1st	
1966	Dick Busch	13–16	8–4	t-3rd	
1967	Dick Busch	13–18	5–7	t-4th	
1968	Joey August	16–19	6–6	t-3rd	
1969	Joey August	12–19	4–8	t-5th	
1970	Larry Koentopp	30–15	7–5	2nd	
1971	Larry Koentopp	37–16	9–1	1st (Northern)	District VII Regional
1972	Larry Koentopp	34–10	10–1	1st (Northern)	Big Sky tournament
1973	Larry Koentopp	34–17	10–2	1st (Northern)	District VII Regional
1974	Larry Koentopp	45–14	9–2	1st (Northern)	District VII Regional
Big Sky Conference:		260–172–1	78–44		
Northern Pacific Conference (1975–1981)
1975	Larry Koentopp	32–18	16–8	2nd	
1976	Larry Koentopp	43–23	19–5	1st	Rocky Mountain Regional
1977	Larry Koentopp	34–25	14–10	3rd	
1978	Steve Hertz	33–14	18–6	1st	Rocky Mountain Regional
1979	Jim Lawler	25–17	13–11	4th	
1980	Jim Lawler	39–15	23–4	1st	West Regional
1981	Steve Hertz	48–21	25–7	1st	West Regional
Northern Pacific Conference:		254–133	128–51		
Pacific-10 Conference (1982–1995)
1982	Steve Hertz	30–28	10–14	5th (Northern)	
1983	Steve Hertz	17–34	6–18	7th (Northern)	
1984	Steve Hertz	23–29–1	6–14	6th (Northern)	
1985	Steve Hertz	26–23–1	11–13	5th (Northern)	
1986	Steve Hertz	30–21	13–10	2nd (Northern)	Pac-10 North Tournament
1987	Steve Hertz	20–32	8–16	6th (Northern)	Pac-10 North Tournament
1988	Steve Hertz	28–28	12–11	4th (Northern)	Pac-10 North Tournament
1989	Steve Hertz	27–19	15–9	t-2nd (Northern)	Pac-10 North Tournament
1990	Steve Hertz	37–21	13–11	4th (Northern)	Pac-10 North Tournament
1991	Steve Hertz	23–25	8–12	t-4th (Northern)	Pac-10 North Tournament
1992	Steve Hertz	22–30	14–16	5th (Northern)	
1993	Steve Hertz	17–36	9–21	5th (Northern)	
1994	Steve Hertz	29–23	14–16	5th (Northern)	
1995	Steve Hertz	29–25	15–15	3rd (Northern)	
Pacific-10 Conference:		358–374–2	154–196		
West Coast Conference (1996–2026)
1996	Steve Hertz	24–25	12–15	5th	
1997	Steve Hertz	19–33–1	7–21	8th	
1998	Steve Hertz	16–34	10–20	6th	
1999	Steve Hertz	27–23–2	14–14	2nd (West)	
2000	Steve Hertz	28–25	17–13	2nd (Coast)	
2001	Steve Hertz	28–27	17–13	1st (Coast)	WCC Championship Series
2002	Steve Hertz	27–29	14–16	4th (Coast)	
2003	Steve Hertz	26–25–1	14–16	3rd (Coast)	
2004	Mark Machtolf	24–27	16–11	3rd (Coast)	
2005	Mark Machtolf	28–26	15–15	3rd (Coast)	
2006	Mark Machtolf	29–24	9–12	5th	
2007	Mark Machtolf	33–25	15–6	2nd	WCC Championship Series
2008	Mark Machtolf	30–23	10–10	5th	
2009	Mark Machtolf	36–18	14–7	1st	Fullerton Regional
2010	Mark Machtolf	20–36	8–13	t-5th	
2011	Mark Machtolf	32–19–1	15–6	2nd	WCC Championship Series
2012	Mark Machtolf	34–22	14–10	t-3rd	
2013	Mark Machtolf	32–21	18–6	1st	WCC tournament
West Coast Conference:		493–462–5	238–224		
Total:		1394-1189-8			
National champion Postseason invitational champion Conference regular season champion Conference regular season and conference tournament champion Division regular season champion Division regular season and conference tournament champion Conference tournament champion

== Notable former players ==
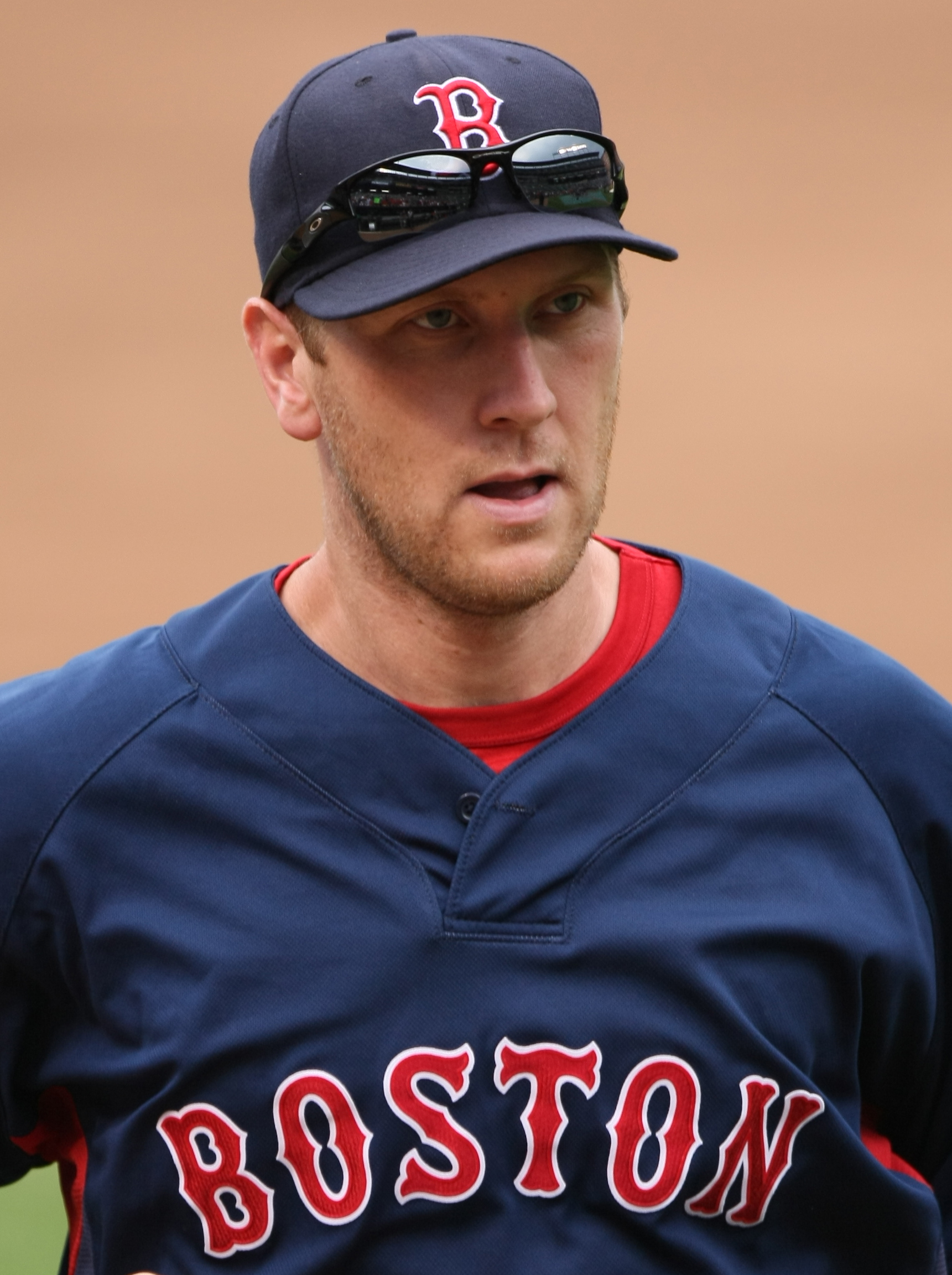
Jason Bay in 2009 with the Boston Red Sox

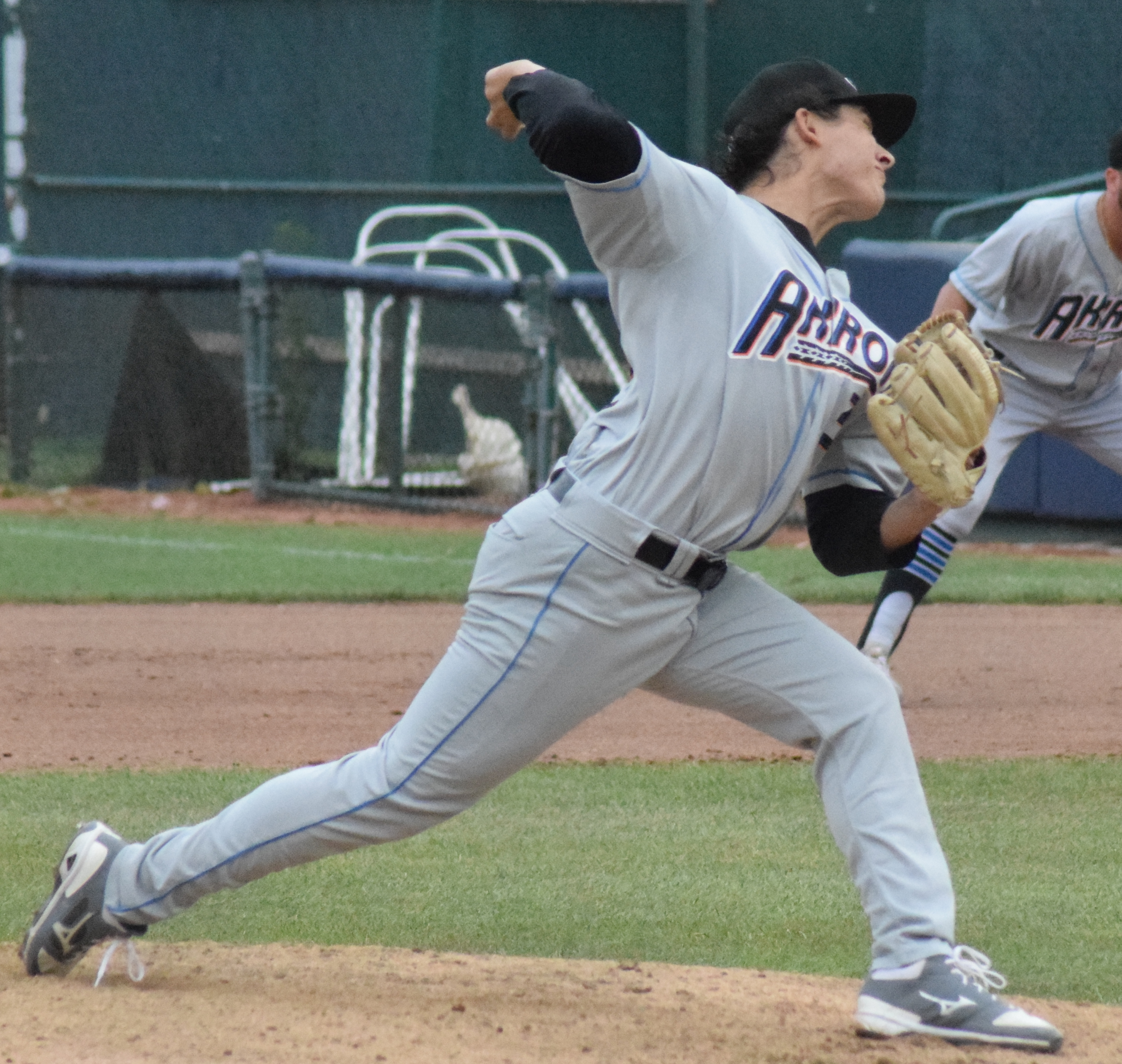
Pitcher Eli Morgan

Below is a list of notable former Bulldogs and the seasons in which they played for the program.

- Steve Ames (2009)
- Brandon Bailey (2014–2016)
- Jason Bay (1998–1999)
- Rich Beck (1961–1962)
- T. R. Bryden (1980–1981)
- Leon Cadore (1906–1908)
- Ryan Carpenter (2009–2011)
- Mike Davey (1972–1974)
- Marco Gonzales (2011–2013)
- Tom Gorman (1977–1980)
- Bo Hart (1999–2000)
- Steve Hertz (1970–1972)
- Mel Ingram (1925–1928)
- Taylor Jones (2013–2016)
- Casey Legumina (2017–2019)
- Cody Martin (2008–2011)
- Wyatt Mills (2014–2016)
- Eli Morgan (2015-2017)
- Clayton Mortensen (2006–2007)
- Brett Nicholas (2008–2009)
- Tyler Olson (2009–2013)
- Casey Parsons (1973–1976)
- Mike Redmond (1990–1993)
- Kevin Richardson (2001–2002)
- Michael Rucker (2013)
- Lenn Sakata (1973–1974)
- Dave Skeels (1910)
- Jack Spring (1951)
- Rick Sweet (1973–1975)

=== Retired numbers ===
The first retired number for the program was number 19 in 1982, worn by walk-on third baseman Mac Gebbers (1978–1982).

=== 2012 MLB draft ===
Two Bulldogs were selected in the 2012 Major League Baseball draft: OF Royce Bolinger by the Texas Rangers (6th round) and P Tyler Olson by the Oakland Athletics (17th round). Bolinger signed a professional contract with the Rangers, while Olson chose not to sign with Oakland.

=== 2017 MLB draft ===
Pitcher Eli Morgan was selected by the Cleveland Indians in the eighth round of the 2017 Major League Baseball draft. He signed with the Indians for a $135,000 signing bonus, and made his MLB debut in 2021.

=== 2018 MLB draft ===
Two Bulldogs were selected in the 2018 Major League Baseball draft: P Daniel Bies by the New York Yankees (7th round) and P Casey Legumina by the Cleveland Indians (35th round). Bies signed with the Yankees, Legumina is currently unsigned.

== See also ==
- List of NCAA Division I baseball programs
