= Washington Trust Bank =

American commercial bank

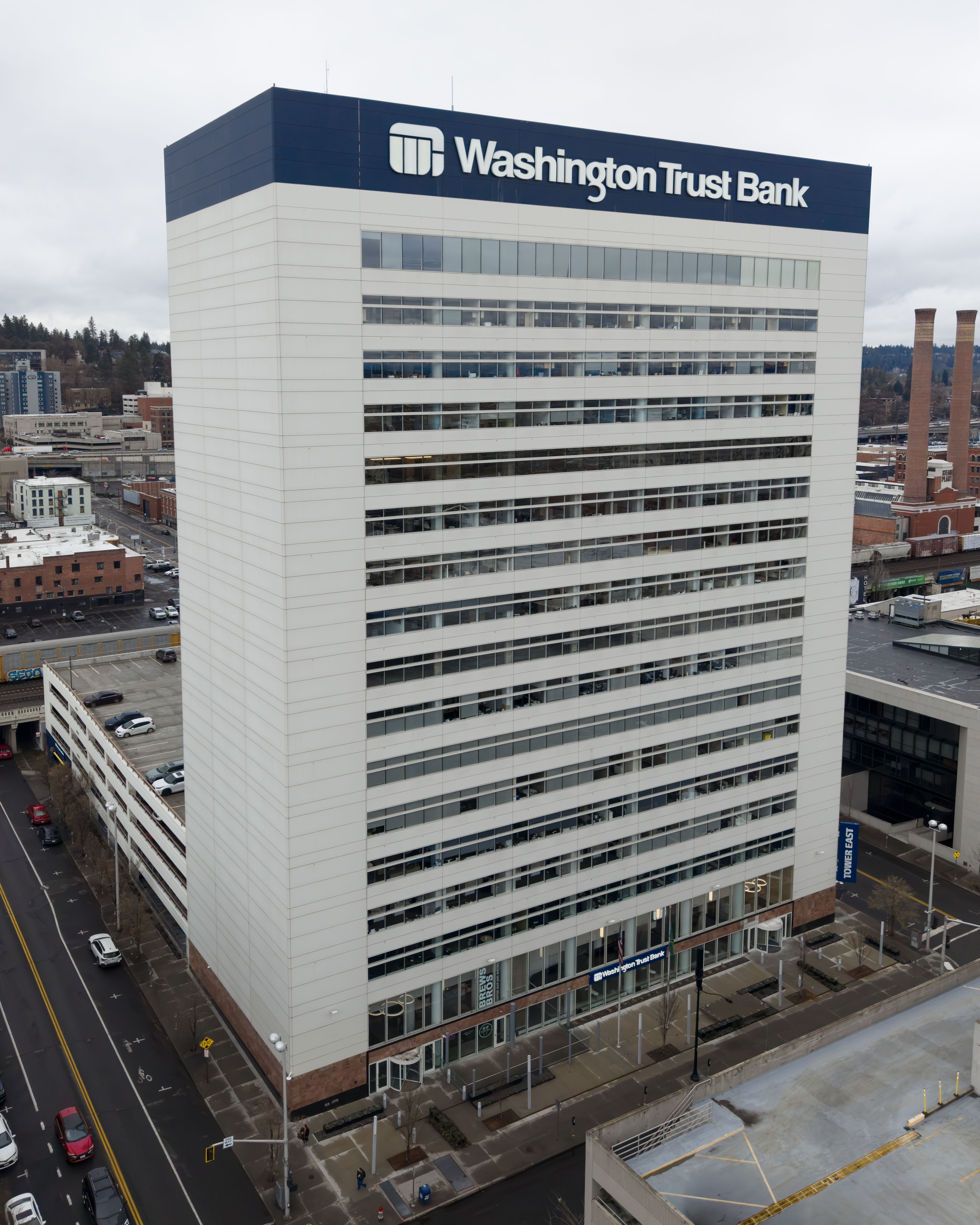
- Washington Trust Bank office building in Spokane, Washington
- Formerly: Washington Trust Company (1902-1951)
- Company type: Subsidiary
- Founded: 1902; 124 years ago in Spokane, Washington, U.S.
- Founders: J. Grier Long; Martin B. Connelly; R.L.Webster
- Headquarters: 717 W Sprague Ave, Spokane Washington, U.S.
- Key people: Peter Q. Stanton (Executive Chairman); John E. (Jack) Heath, III (CEO); Kevin Blair (President); Jim Branson (COO)
- Products: Personal Banking, Commercial Banking, Private Banking, Home Loans, Wealth Management, Wealth Advisory, Investment Services, Trust Services
- Number of employees: 1,021
- Parent: W.T.B. Financial Corporation
- Website: www.watrust.com

Washington Trust Bank is an American commercial bank headquartered in Spokane, Washington and is a subsidiary of W.T.B. Financial Corporation. It has more than 40 financial centers and offices in Washington, Idaho and Oregon with over 1,000 employees. As of December 2014, the bank had assets in excess of $4.77 billion.

== Background ==
Washington Trust opened in 1902 as The Washington Trust Company. Current Executive Chairman Peter F. Stanton is the fourth generation of the Stanton family to lead the bank.

The bank operates offices throughout Washington, Oregon and Idaho. The first branches in Idaho opened in 1989, while the first branch in Portland opened in 2004. Washington Trust also expanded to the Puget Sound region, opening offices in Seattle in 2000 and in Bellevue in 2004.

W.T.B. Financial Corporation parent company of Washington Trust Bank went public on the OTC Markets in 2001, under the Ticker symbols WTBFA (Class A voting shares) and WTBFB (Class B non-voting shares).

=== Services ===
Services offered by the bank include personal and commercial banking, home loans, private banking, wealth management and advisory services, trust services and investment services. Washington Trust has ranked first in deposits in Spokane County since 2009.
