= Ben Orloff =

American baseball player and coach (born 1987)

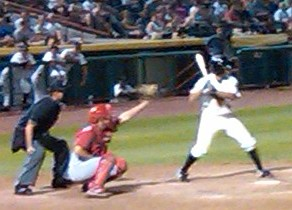
- Orloff (right) batting for the Tri-City ValleyCats in 2010

Current position
- Title: Head coach
- Team: UC Irvine
- Conference: Big West
- Record: 271–141 (.658)

Biographical details
- Born: April 26, 1987 (age 39); Simi Valley, California, U.S.

Playing career
- 2006–2009: UC Irvine
- 2009: Greeneville Astros
- 2009–2010: Tri-City ValleyCats
- 2011: Lexington Legends
- 2012: Lancaster JetHawks
- 2012–2013: Corpus Christi Hooks
- Position: Shortstop

Coaching career (HC unless noted)
- 2016–2018: UC Irvine (asst)
- 2019–present: UC Irvine

Head coaching record
- Overall: 271–141 (.658)
- Tournaments: NCAA: 7–6

Accomplishments and honors

Championships
- 2 Big West regular season (2021, 2025)

Awards
- Big West Conference Player of the Year (2009); All-American (2009); Brooks Wallace Award (2009); 2× Big West Coach of the Year (2021, 2025)

Ben Orloff (born April 26, 1987) is an American baseball coach and former shortstop, who is the current head baseball coach of the UC Irvine Anteaters. He played college baseball at UC Irivine for head coach Mike Gillespie, where he won the Brooks Wallace Award, as the nation's best college shortstop. He has also played in the World Baseball Classic for Israel before pursuing a professional baseball career in the Houston Astros organization from 2009 to 2013. He retired on June 12, 2013, and became an assistant coach for the UC Irvine.

== High school and college ==
Orloff attended Simi Valley High School in Simi Valley, California, where he played for the school's baseball team as a shortstop, winning the California Interscholastic Federation championship in his junior year. He then enrolled at the University of California, Irvine (UC Irvine), where he played college baseball for the Anteaters in the Big West Conference (BWC). He began his freshman season as a second baseman, but became the team's starting shortstop later in the year. He led the nation in sacrifice hits as a freshman, but struggled with a .217 batting average. He improved his hitting in his sophomore season, as he finished the year with a .324 average.

After his junior year in which Orloff had a .344 batting average, the Colorado Rockies drafted him in the 19th round of the 2008 Major League Baseball draft, but he returned to college for his senior year. In the 2009 season, Orloff had a .358 batting average and was named BWC player of the year as the Anteaters won their first BWC championship. Orloff received further recognition, as he won the Brooks Wallace Award as the nation's top collegiate shortstop, and received first-team All-America honors from the National Collegiate Baseball Writers Association and third-team All-American honors from Collegiate Baseball. Orloff also set school records for career hits (280), runs scored (178), and games played (241).

== Professional career ==
The Houston Astros drafted Orloff in the ninth round of the 2009 Major League Baseball draft, and he signed. He suffered from elbow tendinitis in 2009, while playing for the Tri-City ValleyCats of the Class A-Short Season New York–Penn League (NYP). Returning to Tri-City in 2010, Orloff led the team with a .307 batting average and 52 runs scored. He was named to the team's most valuable player and was recognized as a member of the NYP's all-star team. He played for the Lexington Legends of the Class A South Atlantic League in 2011, and the Lancaster JetHawks of the Class A-Advanced California League and Corpus Christi Hooks of the Class AA Texas League in 2012. He returned to Corpus Christi in 2013, and retired 41 games into the season.

Orloff, who is Jewish, played on the Israeli national baseball team during the qualifying round of the 2013 World Baseball Classic. Orloff did not play in the opening game of the qualifier, or in the final game. Orloff's only appearance was as the starting second baseman in the second game, batting ninth, and going 0 for 3 and leaving 3 men on base.

== Coaching career ==
In 2013, Orloff rejoined UC Irvine's baseball team as an assistant coach. Head coach Mike Gillespie retired after the 2018 season, and Orloff succeeded him as head coach. In his third season with the Anteaters, Orloff lead the team to the Big West Conference championship, winning Coach of the Year in the conference.

Record table
Season	Team	Overall	Conference	Standing	Postseason
UC Irvine Anteaters (Big West Conference) (2019–present)
2019	UC Irvine	37–17	17–7	T-2nd	
2020	UC Irvine	8–7	0–0		Season canceled due to COVID-19
2021	UC Irvine	43–18	32–8	1st	NCAA Regional
2022	UC Irvine	32–24	16–14	6th	
2023	UC Irvine	38–17	19–11	4th	
2024	UC Irvine	45–14	22–8	2nd	NCAA Regional
2025	UC Irvine	43–17	24–6	1st	NCAA Regional
2026	UC Irvine	25–27	14–16	T-6th	
UC Irvine:		271–141 (.658)	144–70 (.673)		
Total:		271–141 (.658)			
National champion Postseason invitational champion Conference regular season champion Conference regular season and conference tournament champion Division regular season champion Division regular season and conference tournament champion Conference tournament champion
