= Washington Trust Field and Patterson Baseball Complex =

Baseball park in Spokane, Washington

- Location in the United States Location in Washington
- Interactive map of Washington Trust Field and Patterson Baseball Complex
- Location: Gonzaga University; Spokane, Washington, U.S.
- Coordinates: 47.663°N 117.399°W
- Owner: Gonzaga University
- Operator: Gonzaga University
- Capacity: 1,300 Permanent
- Surface: Artificial turf
- Field size: Left - 328 ft (100 m); Center - 400 ft (122 m); Right - 328 ft (100 m)

Construction
- Groundbreaking: June 6, 2006
- Opened: March 15, 2007; 19 years ago
- Cost: $7-$8 Million
- Architect: ALSC Architects

Tenant
- Gonzaga Bulldogs (NCAA) (2007–present)

Washington Trust Field and Patterson Baseball Complex is a college baseball park in the northwest United States, located on the campus of Gonzaga University in Spokane, Washington. Opened nineteen years ago in 2007, it is the home venue of the Gonzaga Bulldogs of the Pac-12 Conference.

Designed by architect ALSC Architects, Washington Trust Field and Patterson Baseball Complex has 1,300 fixed seats in the main seating bowl and a total capacity of 2,300. The complex includes field lighting, home and visitors locker rooms, baseball offices, laundry, training and equipment facilities, batting cages, a natural grass field, modern restrooms and concession stands for the convenience of the fans, and an electronic information board and a stone marker welcoming visitors. The playing field is aligned southeast at an elevation just under 1,900 feet (580 m) above sea level; the site was formerly an annex of the U.S. Postal Service. The law school building, opened in 2000, is adjacent to the west.

Patterson Baseball Complex is named after the family of Michael Patterson (class of 1969), chairman of Gonzaga's Board of Trustees and a major contributor to the project. Washington Trust Field is named after Washington Trust Bank in which, Pete Stanton, the chairman and CEO of Washington Trust Bank, and Jack Heath, president of Washington Trust Bank, were the major forces behind the field naming.

The Bulldogs played on campus from 1968 through 2003 at August/ART Stadium (Pecarovich Field until 1996), which was displaced by the construction of McCarthey Athletic Center, home of the Gonzaga basketball teams. After ground was broken for McCarthey in April 2003, the baseball team finished the season at Spokane Falls Community College, then played three seasons in Spokane's minor league venue, Avista Stadium.

A few hundred yards south of the old field, ground was broken for the facility in June 2006, and it opened nine months later on March 15, 2007, a 9–4 victory over Rider University. The first night game was played April 17, a 4–7 loss to Washington State; the dedication game was three nights later, a 6–3 conference victory over Saint Mary's.

== See also ==
- List of NCAA Division I baseball venues
