= ONT Field =

Baseball stadium in Ontario, California

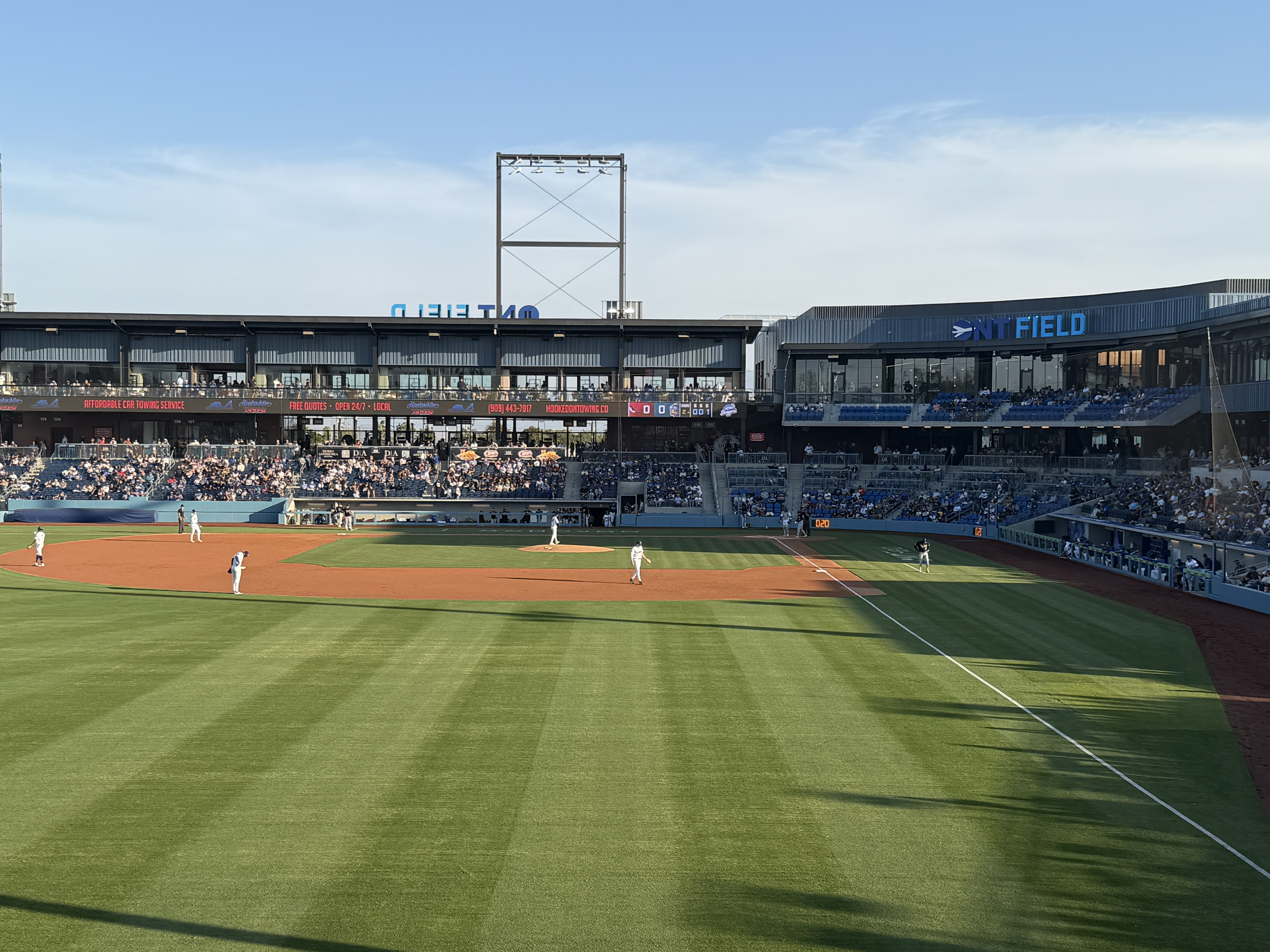
- View of ONT Field from left field

- Location within the Los Angeles metropolitan area Location within California Location within the United States
- Interactive map of ONT Field
- Address: 9375 E. Riverside Dr.
- Location: Ontario, California
- Coordinates: 34.018463°N 117.603318°W
- Owner: City of Ontario
- Capacity: 6,500
- Public transit: Ontario–East

Construction
- Groundbreaking: October 28, 2024
- Opened: March 21, 2026
- Cost: $100 million
- Architect: Populous

Tenant
- Ontario Tower Buzzers (CL) (2026–present)

Website
- www.ontfield.com

ONT Field is a baseball stadium in Ontario, California. It is the home field of the Ontario Tower Buzzers, the California League affiliate team of the Los Angeles Dodgers. It opened on March 21, 2026, with an official seating capacity of 6,500 attendees.

The stadium will be part of the Ontario Sports Empire, a 190-acre multi-use sports complex that will be the largest complex of its kind in the western United States. The Ontario International Airport (ONT) owns the naming rights to the stadium.

== History ==
=== Construction ===
In March 2023, the Ontario City Council approved a $172 million purchase of 112 acres of land, with the intention of building a new sports complex at the intersection of Riverside Drive and Ontario Avenue. Later in August of that year, the city council approved contracts with Populous Holdings and Tilden-Coil Constructors for the construction of a proposed $95 million baseball stadium, which would take up 10 to 12 acres of the property. The city broke ground on October 28, 2024, to begin construction on the Ontario Sports Empire Complex, with the $100 million baseball field to be used as the home field for the Los Angeles Dodgers' new Single-A affiliate Minor League Baseball team.

In September 2025, the Ontario International Airport purchased naming rights to the stadium, naming it ONT Field after the airport's IATA designation. The airport itself is located less than three miles north of the stadium. The new baseball team's name was soon thereafter announced as the Ontario Tower Buzzers, fitting in line with the aviation theme.

=== Early years ===
ONT Field hosted its inaugural event on March 21, 2026, featuring a concert headlined by The Avett Brothers alongside Dwight Yoakam. The Tower Buzzers played their first home game on April 2 against the Lake Elsinore Storm, with 6,611 fans in attendance. In September, the stadium was named the 2026 Ballpark of the Year by BaseballParks.com and USA Today.

== See also ==
- List of California League stadiums
