= Mike Gillespie (baseball) =

American baseball player and coach (1940–2020)

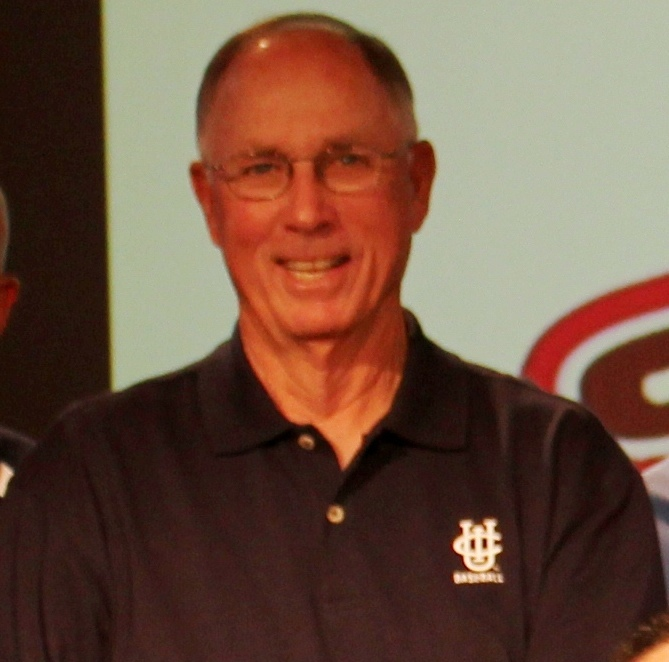
- Gillespie in 2011

Biographical details
- Born: May 7, 1940; Los Angeles, California, U.S.
- Died: July 29, 2020 (aged 80); Irvine, California, U.S.

Playing career
- 1960–1961: USC
- Position(s): Infielder / Outfielder

Coaching career (HC unless noted)
- 1971–1986: College of the Canyons
- 1987–2006: USC
- 2007: Staten Island Yankees
- 2008–2018: UC Irvine

Administrative career (AD unless noted)
- 1977–1986: Canyons

Head coaching record
- Overall: College: 1,156–720–2 (.616); Professional: 47–28 (.627)
- Tournaments: NCAA: 75–44 (.630)

Accomplishments and honors

Championships
- As player: College World Series (1961); As head coach: College World Series (1998); 4× Pac-10 Southern Division (1991, 1995, 1996, 1998); 2× Pac-10 Playoff (1995, 1996); 2× Pac-10 (2001, 2002); Big West (2009)

Awards
- Collegiate Baseball Coach of the Year (1998); NCBWA National Coach of the Year (2014); 3× Pac-10 Southern Division Coach of the Year (1991, 1995, 1996); Pac-10 Coach of the Year (2002); Big West Coach of the Year (2009); 3× ABCA West Region Coach of the Year (1996, 1998, 2014); ABCA Hall of Fame (2010)

Michael James Gillespie (May 7, 1940 – July 29, 2020) was an American college baseball coach. He served as the head coach at UC Irvine and head coach at USC from 1987 to 2006. He led USC to the 1998 College World Series championship, having previously won it as a player in 1961.

== Career ==
=== College ===
Gillespie started his coaching career at the College of the Canyons, a California junior college. He started the school's baseball program in spring 1971 after the school's fall 1969 founding. In sixteen seasons as head coach, he had a 420–167 record.

Gillespie posted a 763–471–2 (.618) record as the coach of USC. In addition to the 1998 championship, he led USC to the CWS in 1995, 2000 and 2001, with the 1995 team advancing to the title game. In 2005, 13 former players coached by Gillespie were playing in Major League Baseball, while six of his former players were All-Stars (including Mark Prior, Barry Zito, Aaron Boone, Bret Boone, and Geoff Jenkins in 2003, and Morgan Ensberg in 2005). He resigned from USC on June 2, 2006.

Gillespie also played baseball at USC under coach Rod Dedeaux, and was a member of the 1961 College World Series champions. Along with Jerry Kindall, he is one of only two individuals who have both played for and coached a College World Series champion. He was succeeded as USC's head coach by Chad Kreuter, a former major league catcher who is married to Gillespie's daughter Kelly.

In September 2007, Gillespie was named coach of UC Irvine's baseball team, replacing Dave Serrano, who had just guided the Anteaters to their first CWS appearance but left to take over at Cal State Fullerton.

On January 8, 2010, Gillespie was inducted into the American Baseball Coaches Association (ABCA) Hall of Fame.

=== Professional ===
On February 2, 2007, Gillespie was named manager of the New York–Penn League Staten Island Yankees. He replaced Gaylen Pitts, who led the team to its second consecutive New York–Penn League Championship. In his only season, he led them to a 47–28 record.

== Death ==
Gillespie died on July 29, 2020, in Irvine, California. He was 80, and had suffered from lung issues and a stroke in the time leading up to his death.

== Head coaching record ==
Below is a table of Gillespie's yearly records as an NCAA head baseball coach.

Statistics overview
Season	Team	Overall	Conference	Standing	Postseason
USC Trojans (Pacific-10 Conference) (1987–2006)
1987	USC	32–28	12–18	T–5th (South)	
1988	USC	36–26	13–17	4th (South)	NCAA Regional
1989	USC	41–25	16–14	3rd (South)	NCAA Regional
1990	USC	40–22	18–12	3rd (South)	NCAA Regional
1991	USC	46–17–1	23–7	1st (South)	NCAA Regional
1992	USC	28–26	13–17	6th (South)	
1993	USC	35–29	15–15	4th (South)	NCAA Regional
1994	USC	41–20	19–11	3rd (South)	NCAA Regional
1995	USC	49–21	21–9	1st (South)	College World Series
1996	USC	44–16–1	24–6	1st (South)	NCAA Regional
1997	USC	42–20	17–13	3rd (South)	NCAA Regional
1998	USC	49–17	21–9	1st (South)	CWS champions
1999	USC	36–26	17–7	2nd	NCAA Super Regional
2000	USC	44–20	16–8	4th	College World Series
2001	USC	45–19	18–6	1st	College World Series
2002	USC	37–24	17–7	1st	NCAA Super Regional
2003	USC	28–28	11–13	T–5th	
2004	USC	24–32	10–14	T–6th	
2005	USC	41–22	15–9	T–3rd	NCAA Super Regional
2006	USC	25–33	11–13	T–5th	
USC:		763–471–2 (.618)	327–225 (.592)		
UC Irvine Anteaters (Big West Conference) (2008–2018)
2008	UC Irvine	42–18	14–10	T–3rd	NCAA Super Regional
2009	UC Irvine	45–15	22–2	1st	NCAA Regional
2010	UC Irvine	39–21	17–7	2nd	NCAA Regional
2011	UC Irvine	43–18	16–8	2nd	NCAA Super Regional
2012	UC Irvine	31–25	13–11	4th	
2013	UC Irvine	33–22	15–12	T–4th	
2014	UC Irvine	41–25	15–9	3rd	College World Series
2015	UC Irvine	33–23	15–9	3rd	
2016	UC Irvine	31–25	11–13	8th	
2017	UC Irvine	23–33	9–15	7th	
2018	UC Irvine	32–24	13–11	T–3rd	
UC Irvine:		393–249 (.612)	162–105 (.607)		
Total:		1,156–720–2 (.616)			
National champion Postseason invitational champion Conference regular season champion Conference regular season and conference tournament champion Division regular season champion Division regular season and conference tournament champion Conference tournament champion

== See also ==
- List of college baseball career coaching wins leaders
