= Larry Pierce (jockey) =

American jockey

Personal information
- Born: June 19, 1945 (age 81) Clebit, Oklahoma, United States
- Occupation: Jockey

Horse racing career
- Sport: Horse racing

Major racing wins
- Longacres Mile (1973)

Racing awards
- Longacres Champion Jockey (1970, 1971, 1976)

Honours
- Washington Racing Hall of Fame (2008)

Significant horses
- Turbulator

Larry Pierce (born June 19, 1945 in Clebit, Oklahoma) is a retired American Thoroughbred horse racing jockey known as one of the north-western United States' finest.

== Life and career ==
Larry Pierce is younger brother of U. S. Racing Hall of Fame jockey Donald. His ex-wife Terri was the daughter of noted California jockey Donald MacAndrew. He and Terri had three children, Brett, Brandi, and Aaron. Of his three children only Brett followed his father's footsteps on the race track, starting his riding career shortly after his father's retirement. His son, Brett, currently works for Emerald Downs and gallops in the morning.

He began riding at age 16 and came to Seattle to ride in 1963. In 1966 he set a world record on Sandy Fleet going 6½ furlongs. 4 years later he was to break this record on a little-known horse who would later make Washington Thoroughbred Horse history, Turbulator. One of the most noted rides that Pierce and Turbulator had was a loss in the Longacres Mile in 1970 when the horse banged into the gate at the start breaking his left stirrup. Pierce managed to stay on board but was beaten by 2 lengths and finished in 5th place. Pierce earned his only win in the Longacres Mile in 1973 on Silver Mallet.

Larry Pierce retired from riding in 1984 and turned to training at Longacres until the racetrack shut down in 1992. He continued training afterwards at Emerald Downs and Yakima Meadows. Larry Pierce ranked second all-time leading riders with 63 stakes wins at Longacres (Gary Baze, who is currently still riding holds first place). He also won three leading rider titles during his career. Pierce rode a state record seven winners in one day on May 20, 1972. On September 14, 2008, he was inducted into the Washington Thoroughbred Hall of Fame.
