= Tom Harris (announcer) =

American announcer and sportscaster

Tom Harris (born 11 May 1962) is an American announcer and sportscaster specializing in Thoroughbred horse racing. His style of race announcing is often described as traditional with European and American influences that feature his signature phrase "the runners away".

== Background ==
Tom Harris was born in Dallas, Texas. He started calling horse races at the age of 19 as an apprentice while still attending college, studying broadcast journalism at Arizona State University. Harris was mentored by Bob Weems, who was the long time renowned voice of Monmouth Park in Oceanport, New Jersey and Turf Paradise in Phoenix, Arizona. Though he had announced Greyhound Races at Phoenix Greyhound Park in 1981, he landed his first Horse Race Track Announcer position in 1987 at La Mesa Park in Raton, New Mexico. In the early to mid-1990s Harris went on to call races at Playfair Race Course in Spokane, Washington and Yakima Meadows in Yakima, Washington. He also filled-in for a season at Garden State Park in Cherry Hill, New Jersey in 1991. By the late 1990s, Harris was named Track Announcer of Retama Park near San Antonio, Texas; where he called 15 seasons. Harris was also named Track Announcer of Sam Houston Race Park in Houston, Texas from 2009–2018. Harris has also announced for several other race meets across the United States throughout his career and was the track announcer of Portland Meadows, located in Portland Oregon until its closure in 2019. Harris is currently the track announcer of Emerald Downs, located in Auburn, Washington after returning in 2024 from a two-year hiatus.

== Historical calls ==
Tom Harris called the 20th triple dead heat in Thoroughbred racing (since the advent of the photo finish) in 1996 at Yakima Meadows when all three horses - Fly Like An Angel, Allihavonztheradio, and Terri After Five hit the finish line together in an astonishing race to the wire. Harris's called finish dead-on with "Three heads hit the wire; it's a close one!" and the story made international news across various outlets such as TSN, ESPN, The Washington Post, The Seattle Times and many more.

Harris is believed to have called more races in the history of Texas horse racing since Parimutuel betting was reinstated than any other race announcer in Texas history. It is estimated that Harris has called over 11,500 races during his combined 17-year career at Retama Park in San Antonio and Sam Houston Race Park in Houston.

== Other media and noteworthy credits ==
Tom Harris also served as Public Address Announcer for The Chicago Cubs games during Spring Training at Hohokam Stadium in Mesa, Arizona from 1981 to 1989.

In the early 1990s while announcing horse races at the Yakima Meadows season, he worked a double by serving as Public Address Announcer and later Play by Play Broadcaster for The Yakima Sun Kings of the Continental Basketball Association (CBA); a league that featured the tail end of careers of players like Darryl Dawkins, Manute Bol, Jo Jo English and others.

Harris was thought to have the longest weekly commute to announce two separate race tracks when in the mid-1990s he flew weekly from Playfair Race course in Spokane, Washington to San Antonio, Texas to call races the same week at Retama Park. The arrangement lasted for several weeks until one of the tracks concluded its season. The story was so remarkable that it was co-featured by sportswriter Tim Price on the front page of the sports section of the San Antonio Express News that year.

Harris also served as Operations Manager of Emerald Racing Association at Yakima Meadows when the Seattle area track Longacres Park was closed and while the new replacement track could be built for the Seattle Area. Harris also served as General Manager & Vice President of Racing Operations at Atokad Downs Track in South Sioux City, Nebraska from 2001 through 2003. Harris is largely accredited with the successful re-opening of the track after it was closed due to financial struggles from previous ownership several years earlier.
