= Craig G. Roberts =

American horse trainer (1930–2009)

Craig Roberts
Personal information
- Born: December 15, 1930 United States
- Died: May 16, 2009 (aged 78) Seattle, Washington
- Occupation: Trainer

Horse racing career
- Sport: Horse racing
- Career wins: 902

Major racing wins
- Emerald Downs Derby (1971, 1975); Washington Governor's Handicap (1976); WTBOA Lads Stakes (1982, 1984); Muckleshoot Tribal Classic Stakes (1985, 2007); Seattle Handicap (1986, 1989); Bay Meadows Handicap (1993); Native Diver Handicap (1993); Tanforan Handicap (1993); Wickerr Handicap (1993); All American Stakes (1994); Hollywood Gold Cup (1994); Gottstein Futurity (2002); Seattle Slew Handicap (2006); Emerald Handicap (2007)

Racing awards
- Martin Durkan Award (1975)

Significant horses
- Slew of Damascus

Craig G. Roberts (December 15, 1930 – May 16, 2009) was an American Thoroughbred horse racing trainer. He began his career in 1965 and became one of the leading trainers in the Pacific Northwest, competing at Longacres Racetrack and Emerald Downs in the state of Washington. He is best known as the trainer of Slew of Damascus for owners, David & Jill Heerensperger. He had the biggest win of his career in 1994 when the son of U.S. Triple Crown champion Seattle Slew won the Grade I Hollywood Gold Cup.

In 1975, Roberts was voted the Martin Durkan Award, presented annually to a horseman for leadership, cooperation, sportsmanship and excellence on and off the track.

Craig Roberts suffered two strokes in the winter of 2008. In failing health, he was living in Seattle, Washington, when he died from pneumonia on May 16, 2009.

Roberts was a 2009 finalist for induction in the Washington Racing Hall of Fame.
