= Gary Baze =

American jockey

Personal information
- Born: October 25, 1955 (age 71) Sunnyside, Washington
- Occupation: Jockey

Horse racing career
- Sport: Horse racing
- Career wins: 3,504

Major racing wins
- San Francisco Mile Stakes (1975); Gottstein Futurity (1976, 1982); Longacres Mile (1980, 1981, 1985, 1987, 1993); Canadian Derby (1985); Malibu Stakes (1985); Senator Ken Maddy Stakes (1986); Arlington Handicap (1987); Californian Stakes (1987); Las Cienegas Handicap (1987); San Pasqual Handicap (1987); San Simeon Handicap (1987); Speakeasy Stakes (1987); Cinema Handicap (1994); British Columbia Derby (2000); Washington Breeders' Cup Oaks (2000, 2001, 2003, + 2 more); California Oaks (2003)

Honours
- Washington Racing Hall of Fame (2003)

Significant horses
- Trooper Seven, Captain Condo

Gary Baze (born October 25, 1955, in Sunnyside, Washington) is an American Thoroughbred horse racing jockey. An inductee of the Washington State Racing Hall of Fame, his Hall of Fame profile says of him: "As much as anything, Baze is respected throughout the industry for his honesty, courtesy, sportsmanship and work ethic."

A member of the renowned Baze racing family, his father, Carl Albert Baze, was a trainer in Washington State for many years. In 1972, Gary Baze embarked on his career, doing his apprenticeship at the Playfair Race Course in Spokane, Washington.

Washington State's all-time leading jockey, during his career Gary Baze won a record six riding titles at Longacres Racetrack in Renton, Washington, before the track closed in 1992. He retired from racing in 1996 to work for the Jockeys' Guild but returned to riding at Emerald Downs in 2000. That year, he finished 4th in the standings with 80 wins. His 351 career wins at Emerald Downs rank #10 all time. He also ranks #7 in earnings ($4,300,565) and #4 in stakes wins (26) entering the 2011 season at Emerald Downs.

In 2009, Gary Baze was a finalist for the prestigious George Woolf Memorial Jockey Award.

On April 1, 1999, Gary Baze married jockey Vicky Aragon, herself a winner of more than 1,500 races at the time.

Gary's Parents are Carl Albert (deceased) and Alice Mary Baze (Cochran). He has four brothers; Earl T. Baze, Carl R. Baze, Michael B. Baze and Kelly L. Baze, and one sister, Toni Y. Norton (Baze).
