= Gottstein Futurity =

- Class: Non-Listed Black Type
- Location: Emerald Downs; Auburn, Washington, USA
- Inaugurated: 1940
- Race type: Thoroughbred - Flat racing
- Website: emeralddowns.com

Race information
- Distance: 1 1/16 miles (8.5 furlongs)
- Surface: Dirt
- Track: left-handed
- Qualification: Two-year-olds
- Purse: US$100,000 (2019)

The Gottstein Futurity is a race for Thoroughbred horses run annually at Emerald Downs racetrack in Auburn, Washington. The mile and one-sixteenth race is open to two-year-old horses of either sex and is run as part of the year's closing racecard.

== History ==
First run in 1940 at Longacres Racetrack in Renton as the Washington State Futurity, in 1993 the race was moved to Yakima Meadows in Yakima and to its present location in 1996. There was no race held in 1943 due to various federal government wartime restrictions.

The Futurity was renamed in 1971 to honor Joseph Gottstein (1891–1971), a racehorse owner as well as the builder and proprietor of Longacres Racetrack about whom the widely respected turf writer and founding president of the National Turf Writers Association Joe Hirsch called "one of the great figures in racetrack management".

Chronology of race names:

- Washington Futurity: 1940–1970
- Joe Gottstein Washington Futurity: 1971
- Joe Gottstein Futurity: 1972–1995
- Gottstein Futurity: 1996–present

Race distances:

- 1 1/16 miles : 1987–2011, 2013–present
- 1 mile : 2012
- 6½ furlongs : 1963–1986
- 6 furlongs : 1950–1962
- 5½ furlongs : 1940–1949

The Futurity was run in two divisions in 1958, 1960 and 1963.

== Records ==
- In 2004 Positive Prize set the fastest time for this race with a winning time of 1:41 2/5.
- In 2009 Koala Beach recorded the widest margin of victory at 8 lengths.

Most wins by a jockey:

- 4 – Gallyn Mitchell (2000, 2002, 2009, 2010)

Most wins by a trainer:

- 7 – Bud Klokstad (1986, 1989, 1990, 1992, 1997, 2000, 2003)

== Winners ==
Emerald Downs 2018 Media Guide and race history:

| Year | Winner | Jockey | Trainer | Owner | Dist. (Miles) / (Furlongs) | Time | Win$ |
|---|---|---|---|---|---|---|---|
| 2019 | Race Home | Kevin Krigger | Manny Ortiz | Tim Bankers | 11/16 M | 1:44.18 | $51,150 |
| 2018 | Northwest Factor | Gary Wales | Steve Bullock | How We Roll #4 | 11/16 M | 1:44.99 | $47,850 |
| 2017 | Elliott Bay | Jennifer Whitaker | Howard E. Belvoir | Rising Star Stable II | 11/16 M | 1:43.08 | $52,250 |
| 2016 | Blazinbeauty | Isaias Enriquez | Francis X. Lucarelli | Darrin L. Paul | 11/16 M | 1:45.00 | $40,750 |
| 2015 | Gold Rush Dancer | Julien Couton | William Tollett | John E. Parker | 11/16 M | 1:43.45 | $35,393 |
| 2014 | Prime Engine | Isaias Enriquez | Michael Puhich | Dr. Mark Dedomenico | 11/16 M | 1:44.49 | $35,393 |
| 2013 | Del Rio Harbor | Julien Couton | Doris A. Harwood | Bar C & Desert Rose Racing | 11/16 M | 1:43.85 | $37,125 |
| 2012 | Music of My Soul | Leslie Mawing | Doris A. Harwood | Elttaes Stable | 1 M | 1:36.90 | $35,393 |
| 2011 | Talk to My Lawyer | Leslie Mawing | Chris Stenslie | Will This One Do Stable | 11/16 M | 1:44.26 | $32,175 |
| 2010 | Couldabenthewhisky | Gallyn Mitchell | Bonnie Jenne | Friendship/Longshot/Fredrickson | 11/16 M | 1:42.60 | $37,125 |
| 2009 | Koala Beach | Gallyn Mitchell | Doris A. Harwood | Jeffrey O. Harwood | 11/16 M | 1:42.80 | $37,125 |
| 2008 | Gallant Son | Leslie Mawing | Francis X. Lucarelli | C & D Randall | 11/16 M | 1:41.60 | $49,500 |
| 2007 | Smarty Deb | Ricky Frazier | Doris A. Harwood | Northwest Farms | 11/16 M | 1:42.40 | $49,500 |
| 2006 | Pirates Deputy | Nathan Chaves | Aubrey C. Villyard | Villyard/Shapiro/Tweedy | 11/16 M | 1:42.20 | $54,450 |
| 2005 | Schoolin You | Miguel Perez | Jim Penney | Feuerborns & Maryanskis | 11/16 M | 1:42.80 | $55,000 |
| 2004 | Positive Prize | Ricky Frazier | Tim McCanna | Ross McLeod & Charles Ming | 11/16 M | 1:41.40 | $55,000 |
| 2003 | Corvallis Dee | Kevin Radke | Bud W. Klokstad | Art McFadden | 11/16 M | 1:43.60 | $55,000 |
| 2002 | Condotierri | Gallyn Mitchell | Craig G. Roberts | Sept. House, Pavalunas, Redd | 11/16 M | 1:45.00 | $55,000 |
| 2001 | Horatio | Javier Matias | David V. Forster | Thrift Ranch | 11/16 M | 1:46.40 | $55,000 |
| 2000 | Jumron Won | Gallyn Mitchell | Bud W. Klokstad | Bill Segale & Ray Rossatto | 11/16 M | 1:44.00 | $55,000 |
| 1999 | No Curfew | Nathan Chaves | Francis X. Lucarelli | Curt & Lila Lanning | 11/16 M | 1:43.40 | $55,000 |
| 1998 | Vino Rossi | Pedro Alvarado | Terry Gillihan | Northwest Farms | 11/16 M | 1:43.20 | $49,500 |
| 1997 | I.M. Bzy* | Chelsea Zupan | Bud W. Klokstad | Bill Segale | 11/16 M | 1:43.40 | $49,500 |
| 1996 | Name for Norm | Chris Loseth | C. Edward Thompson | Bindy Sangara/C. E. Thompson | 11/16 M | 1:45.20 | $49,500 |
| 1995 | Knights Image | William Southwick | Ray E. Tracy, Jr. | Winnwood Farm | 11/16 M | 1:43.00 | $64,350 |
| 1994 | Favored One | Bryan Campbell | William McMeans | Gunshy Manor | 11/16 M | 1:42.40 | $59,292 |
| 1993 | G L Junior | Jack Kaenel | Richard D. Wright | Gordon Lyons | 11/16 M | 1:43.60 | $60,210 |
| 1992 | Staff Rider | Timothy Doocy | Bud W. Klokstad | Jollie Four Stable | 11/16 M | 1:43.40 | $118,881 |
| 1991 | Whatcom Warrior | Gary Boulanger | Mark Molina | J & H Stable | 11/16 M | 1:46.00 | $126,819 |
| 1990 | Time To Pass | Gary Boulanger | Bud W. Klokstad | Jollie Four Stable | 11/16 M | 1:43.60 | $106,218 |
| 1989 | T. D. Passer | Tim Camargo | Bud W. Klokstad | Jollie Four Stable | 11/16 M | 1:45.20 | $97,011 |
| 1988 | Maharesred | Alex Solis | Marion L. Smith | Joyce Bell | 11/16 M | 1:43.20 | $85,320 |
| 1987 | Saratoga Passage | Joe Steiner | Robert W. Leonard | Saratoga I Stable | 11/16 M | 1:43.40 | $89,091 |
| 1986 | O. K. Yet | Ron Hansen | Bud W. Klokstad | Klokstad, Holman & Kays | 61/2 F | 1:16.60 | $78,375 |
| 1985 | Krupa | Gary Stevens | Ermon McLaughlin | Imperial Stables, Inc. | 61/2 F | 1:16.00 | $72,134 |
| 1984 | Table Express | Jerry Pruitt | William Tollett | Sullivan & Guthmiller | 61/2 F | 1:16.00 | $76,693 |
| 1983 | Jason's Drummer | Russell Baze | Eugene Stallings | Donald W. Mar | 61/2 F | 1:16.80 | $75,268 |
| 1982 | Big Flyer | Gary Baze | Kay Vaughan | Mr. & Mrs. R. F. Vaughan | 61/2 F | 1:18.20 | $58,798 |
| 1981 | Belle of Rainier | Danny Sorenson | William Findlay | Al Benton | 61/2 F | 1:17.40 | $59,166 |
| 1980 | Question | Basil Frazier | Cliff Balcom | IHN Stable | 61/2 F | 1:16.00 | $68,410 |
| 1979 | Loto Canada | Wendell Matt | Len Kasmerski | Patti & Lee Brauer | 61/2 F | 1:15.80 | $58,270 |
| 1978 | Knights Choice | Bill Shoemaker | Chay R. Knight | Northwest Farms | 61/2 F | 1:17.00 | $55,265 |
| 1977 | Saratoga Dancer | Mike James | William McMeans | Dasso & Golob | 61/2 F | 1:18.40 | $57,320 |
| 1976 | Power Pays | Gary Baze | T. D. McLaughlin | Corliss McLaughlin | 61/2 F | 1:18.60 | $48,650 |
| 1975 | Banchory Bob | Russell Baze | Luke Rakow | V. & M. Wilson | 61/2 F | 1:16.20 | $53,745 |
| 1974 | Sing A Roni | David Jones | Martin Kenney | Paskey Dedomenico | 61/2 F | 1:16.60 | $54,270 |
| 1973 | Chief Kamiakin | Jack Arnold | Jim Penney | Pettit & Patrick | 61/2 F | 1:16.60 | $47,000 |
| 1972 | Koko's Pal | Lenny Knowles | William McMeans | Riverview Farm | 61/2 F | 1:17.20 | $43,970 |
| 1971 | Prince Joda | Lenny Knowles | William McMeans | D. & J. Taylor | 61/2 F | 1:15.60 | $33,645 |
| 1970 | Royal Ruler | Lenny Knowles | William McMeans | Emerald Stables | 61/2 F | 1:15.20 | $30,495 |
| 1969 | Bouncing Kim | Jack Leonard | Darrell F. Cannon | Elttaes Farm | 61/2 F | 1:15.20 | $27,175 |
| 1968 | Proud Admiral | Frank Inda | William McMeans | Solomon & Dasso | 61/2 F | 1:16.40 | $29,475 |
| 1967 | Pataha Prince | Larry Pierce | Jim Penney | Arden Archer Jr. | 61/2 F | 1:16.40 | $27,950 |
| 1966 | Gallant Command | Lino Burgos | J. B. Gould | J. B. Gould | 61/2 F | 1:16.00 | $23,350 |
| 1965 | March Wind | Lino Burgos | Mel Weipert | North Star Stable | 61/2 F | 1:16.60 | $22,600 |
| 1964 | Alation | Eugene Stallings | Joseph H. Boyce | C. J. Sebastian | 61/2 F | 1:16.60 | $21,620 |
| 1963-1 | Dusky Glitter | Gilbert Simonis | Joseph H. Boyce | Swiftsure Stable | 61/2 F | 1:17.00 | $12,090 |
| 1963-2 | Smogy Dew | Jim Craswell | Glen Williams | Irwin & Venema Ranniger | 61/2 F | 1:16.00 | $11,590 |
| 1962 | Fifty Calibre | Don Richards | Roy Steele | Vorce & Steele | 6 F | 1:11.20 | $15,095 |
| 1961 | Dr. John H. | Paul Frey | Joseph H. Boyce | C. J. Sebastian | 6 F | 1:10.20 | $13,535 |
| 1960-1 | Amblecane | John Andrews | Humphrey Roberts | Mr. & Mrs. Humphrey Roberts | 6 F | 1:12.00 | $8,165 |
| 1960-2 | Mercuria | Jim Craswell | Pete Elixman | Newcap Stable & Elixman | 6 F | 1:12.40 | $8,390 |
| 1959 | Te Amo Weep | Paul Frey | Wayne Branch | B. L. Branch | 6 F | 1:12.40 | $12,760 |
| 1958-1 | Jerry's Gal | Pepper Porter | L. L. Dorsett | G. C. Newell | 6 F | 1:11.40 | $7,625 |
| 1958-2 | Cold Bay | Merill Faulkner | Rhodes Donnell | C. J. Sebastian | 6 F | 1:11.40 | $7,750 |
| 1957 | Val Glitter | Don Pierce | Joseph H. Boyce | Mrs. Joseph H. Boyce | 6 F | 1:11.40 | $9,490 |
| 1956 | Ambolero | Bud Zollinger | Humphrey Roberts | I. R. Levine | 6 F | 1:10.40 | $8,925 |
| 1955 | Fourth Act | D. Barber | G. Abbot | S. A. Agnew | 6 F | 1:13.00 | $8,920 |
| 1954 | Better Not Bet | Grant Zufelt | Jim Mihalcik | C & C Stable | 6 F | 1:10.60 | $8,730 |
| 1953 | Call Call | K. Taylor | Walt Peltier | Walt Peltier | 6 F | 1:09.60 | $8,200 |
| 1952 | Rover Bill | Merlin Volzke | John Kindred | Herb Armstrong | 6 F | 1:10.80 | $7,800 |
| 1951 | Mr. Banjo | Gilbert Simonis | A. E. Penney | A. E. Penney | 6 F | 1:12.00 | $7,530 |
| 1950 | Better Wave | Ferrill Zufelt | Earl Armstrong | J. M. Carlson | 6 F | 1:11.40 | $7,720 |
| 1949 | Reminder | Frank Brewster | Frank Brewster | Willie Dennis | 51/2 F | 1:05.60 | $4,685 |
| 1948 | Lucille Angel | John Gilbert | Allen B. Drumheller | Allen B. Drumheller | 51/2 F | 1:07.60 | $4,420 |
| 1947 | Happy Valley | Hack Lasswell | Frances Keller | Herb Armstrong | 51/2 F | 1:08.00 | $4,350 |
| 1946 | Kay Valley | Charles Beckmann | Earl Armstrong | Herb Armstrong | 51/2 F | 1:07.00 | $4,380 |
| 1945 | Hank H. | J. W. Bailey | Earl Barbour | Allen B. Drumheller | 51/2 F | 1:07.00 | $2,590 |
| 1944 | Super Valley | Charlies Ralls | Norman R. McLeod | Granger & Hanrahan | 51/2 F | 1:06.20 | $2,195 |
| 1943 | Race not held | | | | | | |
| 1942 | Golden Rocket | Eugene Stribling | Eugene Stribling | Gus Dye | 51/2 F | 1:06.20 | $1,410 |
| 1941 | Prince Ernest | Willie Cassity | Earl Armstrong | B. N. Hutchinson | 51/2 F | 1:05.60 | $1,260 |
| 1940 | Campus Fusser | Allen Gray | Allen B. Drumheller | B. N. Hutchinson | 51/2 F | 1:05.40 | $875 |

* My Constant Star was disqualified from purse money in 1997.
