= Spokane Indians =

Minor league baseball team

- Founded in 1890; Spokane, Washington

Team logo	Cap insignia

Minor league affiliations
- Class: High-A (2021–present)
- Previous classes: Class A Short Season (1972, 1983–2020); Triple-A (1958–1971, 1973–1982); Class B (1892, 1902, 1904–1918, 1920, 1937–1942, 1946–1951, 1955–1956); Class A (1952–1954); Class D (1901); Class F (1898)
- League: Northwest League (1983–present)
- Previous leagues: Pacific Coast League (1973–1982); Northwest League (1972); Pacific Coast League (1958–1971); Northwest League (1955–1956); Western International League (1937–1942, 1946–1954); Pacific Coast International League (1918, 1920); Northwestern League (1905–1917); Pacific National League (1903–1904); Pacific Northwest League (1892, 1898, 1901–1904); Pacific Northwestern League (1891); Pacific Northwest League (1890)

Major league affiliations
- Team: Colorado Rockies (2021–present)
- Previous teams: Texas Rangers (2003–2020); Kansas City Royals (1995–2002); San Diego Padres (1983–1994); California Angels (1982); Seattle Mariners (1979–1981); Milwaukee Brewers (1976–1978); Texas Rangers (1973–1975); Los Angeles Dodgers (1958–1972); Philadelphia Phillies (1953); Brooklyn Dodgers (1947)

Minor league titles
- League titles (14): 1890; 1960; 1970; 1973; 1974; 1987; 1988; 1989; 1990; 1999; 2003; 2005; 2008; 2024
- Division titles (18): 1963; 1967; 1968; 1970; 1973; 1974; 1982; 1987; 1988; 1989; 1990; 1998; 1999; 2003; 2005; 2008; 2010; 2018; 2019
- First-half titles (1): 2024
- Second-half titles (0): none

Team data
- Name: Spokane Indians (1903–1920, 1940–present)
- Previous names: Spokane Hawks (1937–1939); Spokane Smoke Eaters (1902); Spokane Blue Stockings (1901); Spokane Bunchgrassers (1892); Spokane Bunch Grassers (1891)
- Colors: Red, navy, light blue, beige
- Mascots: Otto, Doris the Spokanasaurus, Recycle Man, Ribby the Redband Trout
- Ballpark: Avista Stadium (1958–present)
- Previous parks: Ferris Field (1936–1957)
- Owner(s)/ Operator(s): Brett Sports & Entertainment
- General manager: Kyle Day
- Manager: Tom Sutaris
- Website: milb.com/spokane

The Spokane Indians are a Minor League Baseball team located in Spokane Valley, the city immediately east of Spokane, Washington, in the Pacific Northwest. The Indians are members of the High-A Northwest League (NWL) as an affiliate of the Colorado Rockies. Spokane plays its home games at Avista Stadium, which opened in 1958 and has a seating capacity of 6,752.

From 1958 through 1982, excluding 1972, the Indians were in the Triple-A Pacific Coast League (PCL). They were members of the Class A Short Season Northwest League from 1955 to 1956, in 1972, and from 1983 to 2020. The NWL operated as the High-A West in 2021 and was elevated to the High-A level. They have won 12 league titles: four in the PCL and nine in the NWL. The Spokane region has over a century of history in Minor League Baseball, dating back to the 1890s.

== History ==
=== Before 1958 ===
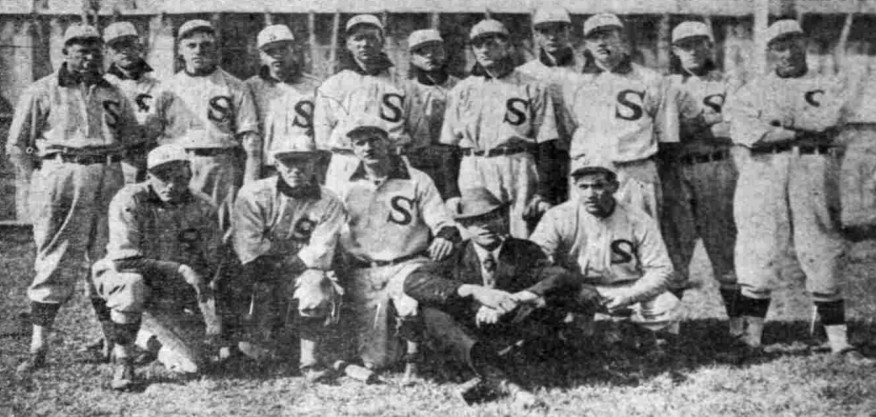
The 1909 Spokane Indians

Spokane's minor league history dates to 1890, when it fielded a team in the Pacific Northwest League. The Spokane Club won the Northwest League pennant in its first season, overcoming teams from Portland, Seattle, and Tacoma, among others. The nickname Indians dates to 1903, when Spokane joined the Pacific National League, a predecessor to the Pacific Coast League and, at Class A, an elite minor league of the period, equivalent to Triple-A today. The Indians lasted only two seasons at that higher level before dropping to the Class B Northwestern League, which folded during World War I.

In 1937, Spokane became a charter member of the Class B Western International League (WIL), the predecessor of the Northwest League. They played at Ferris Field from 1937 through 1942 and 1946 until folding during the 1954 season on June 21.

Spokane was a charter member of the Northwest League, which debuted in 1955 as a Class B league. These Indians also played at Ferris Field, but folded after just two seasons, and the city went without minor league baseball in 1957.

==== The 1946 Spokane bus tragedy ====
In 1946, the WIL Indians were victims of the worst transit accident in the history of American professional sport. On June 24, the team was on its way west to Bremerton by bus to play the Bluejackets. While crossing the Cascade Mountains on a rain-slickened Snoqualmie Pass Highway (then U.S. Route 10), the bus driver swerved to avoid an oncoming car. The Indians' vehicle veered off the road and down an embankment, then crashed and burst into flames.

Nine men died—six of them instantly—and seven were injured. Many survivors had burn injuries. The dead were catcher/manager Mel Cole (age 32), pitchers Bob Kinnaman (28) and George Lyden (23), catcher Chris Hartje (31), infielders Fred Martinez (24), Vic Picetti (18) and George Risk (25), and outfielders Bob James (25) and Bob Paterson (23). Despite a severe head wound, infielder Ben Geraghty was able to struggle back up the mountainside to signal for help. Injured survivors also included pitchers Pete Barisoff, Gus Hallbourg and Dick Powers, catcher Irv Konopka, outfielder Levi McCormack, and bus driver Glen Berg.

One player from the 1946 team, future major league infielder Jack "Lucky" Lohrke, missed the tragedy because his contract was sold to the PCL San Diego Padres on June 24 and he departed the ill-fated bus during a late lunch stop in Ellensburg, not long before the accident, thus helping to earn his nickname. (Lohrke had previously averted tragedy when he was bumped from a military transport plane which later crashed.) Two Indians' pitchers, Milt Cadinha and Joe Faria, were making the trip to Bremerton by automobile and were not aboard the team bus when it crashed.

The Indians, relying on players loaned from other teams, managed to finish the season and placed seventh in the league. A special charity, the Spokane Baseball Benefit Association, donated $114,800 to the injured survivors and dependents of the nine players who died.

Beth Bollinger of Spokane wrote a novel titled Until the End of the Ninth, which is based on the bus crash and its aftermath.

=== Pacific Coast League (1958–1971, 1973–1982) ===
When the Los Angeles Dodgers moved from Brooklyn to the west coast in 1958, they moved their PCL affiliate, the Los Angeles Angels, north to Spokane. While with the Dodgers for 14 seasons, the Indians won league titles in 1960 and 1970, and were runners-up in 1963, 1967, and 1968.

The 1970 Indians, managed by Tommy Lasorda, won 94 of 146 games (.644) in the regular season to win the northern division by 26 games, then swept the Hawaii Islanders in four games in the PCL playoffs. The team included Bill Buckner, Steve Garvey, Bobby Valentine (PCL MVP), Tom Paciorek, Davey Lopes, Bill Russell, and Doyle Alexander.

Following the 1971 season, the club was moved south to New Mexico and became the Albuquerque Dukes. Spokane, which had been in the Northwest League for its first two seasons in 1955 and 1956, returned to the NWL in 1972 as a Dodger affiliate, but only for one season, as a new PCL franchise arrived in 1973 from Portland, becoming the affiliate of the Texas Rangers. The 1973 team, which included Bill Madlock and Lenny Randle, won the west division by eleven games and swept Tucson in three games in the championship series. The following year's club successfully defended the title with another three-game sweep, this time over Albuquerque.

The Indians' second stint in Triple-A lasted ten seasons and included affiliations with the Rangers, which changed to the Milwaukee Brewers in 1976, Seattle Mariners in 1979, and California Angels in 1982. Taking their first division crown since 1974, the Indians defeated Tacoma in the first round, but fell to Albuquerque in the championship series in six games. Soon after that season, the team moved south to Las Vegas and became the Stars. The team's general manager was Larry Koentopp, former head coach and athletic director at Gonzaga. He was the leader of a local ownership group that purchased the team after the 1978 season. The team was purchased for $259,000 in 1978 and was sold in 1993 for $6.1 million.

=== Northwest League (1983–2020) ===
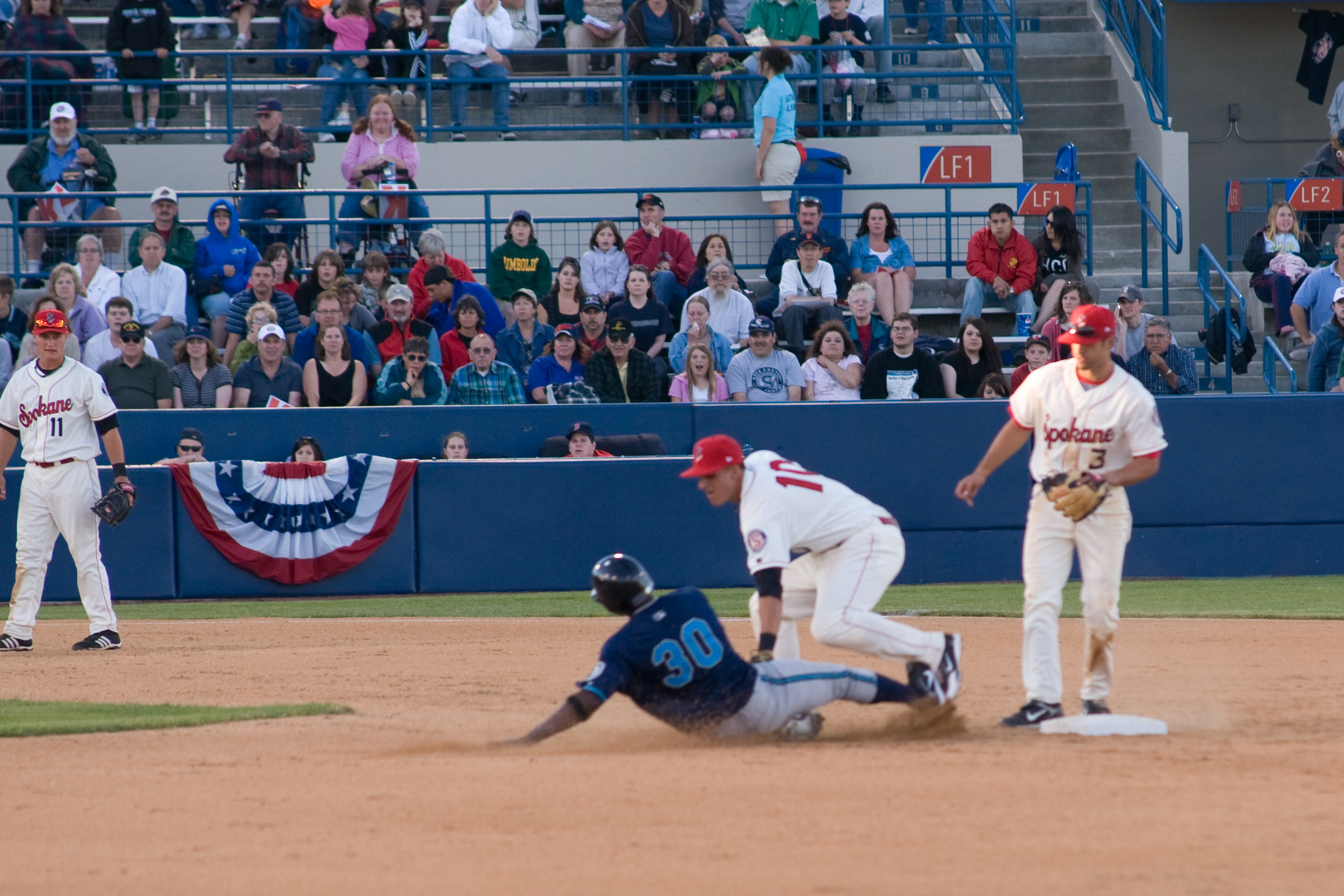
Season opener at a 2008 Indians game against the Everett AquaSox at Avista Stadium

A new NWL franchise was awarded to Spokane for the 1983 season and the Indians have won eight league titles; the first four were consecutive, from 1987 through 1990. The Indians won their seventh NWL championship in 2005, despite a 37–39 (.487) record during the regular season. They became only the second team in league history (after the 1982 Salem Angels) to win the championship with a losing regular season record. Spokane won the east division, then beat league-leading Vancouver on the road in games four and five of the championship series to win the title.

In 2008, the Indians captured their eighth league title with a thrilling four-game series victory over the Salem-Keizer Volcanoes. After dropping the first game, Spokane rallied to an 11–10 win in 10 innings to even the series. In game three, the Indians fell behind 10–2 before rallying for nine unanswered runs to win again 11–10. Spokane won the title with a 6–5 victory in 10 innings in the fourth game.

The Indians were featured in the "Spokane Alphabet" reverse glass painting by Washington artist Melinda Curtin. They were the "I" in the alphabet, cementing their place as an important part of the city of Spokane.

Following the 1985 season, the team was bought by the Brett brothers (John, Ken, Bobby, and George).

=== High-A West and back to the Northwest League (2021–present) ===
In conjunction with Major League Baseball's restructuring of Minor League Baseball in 2021, the Indians were organized into the High-A West along with five other teams previously of the Northwest League. They qualified for the playoffs by finishing with a second-place 67–49 record, but they were defeated by the Eugene Emeralds, 3–1, in the best-of-five championship series. The franchise was recognized with the Minor League Baseball Organization of the Year Award.

The High-A West was rebranded back to the Northwest League in March 2022, as MLB moved to revert all of its Minor Leagues to their historical names.

== Playoffs ==
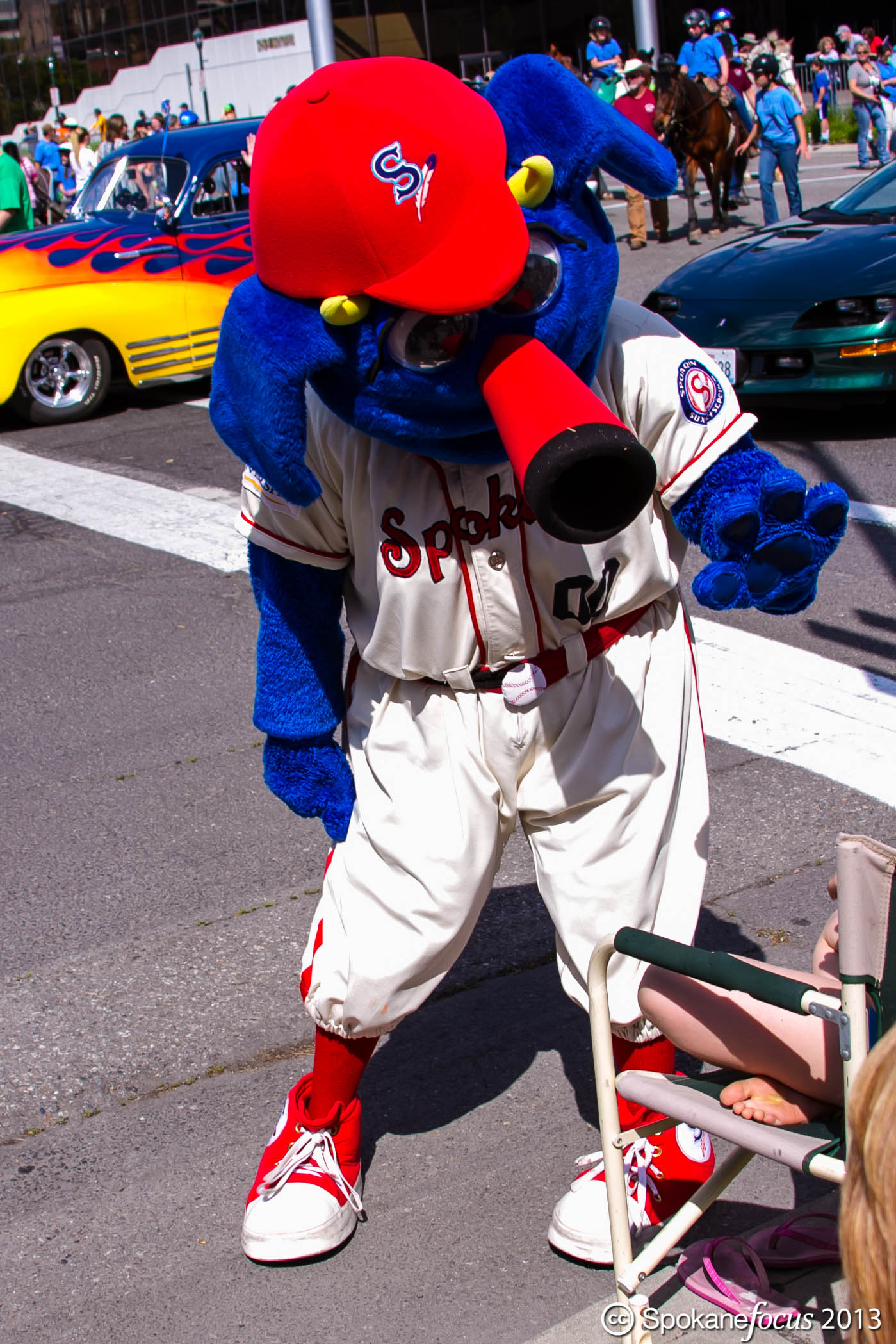
Otto, one of the many mascots of the Spokane Indians

- 1987: Defeated Everett 2–1 to win championship
- 1988: Defeated Southern Oregon 2–1 to win championship
- 1989: Defeated Southern Oregon 2–1 to win championship
- 1990: Defeated Boise 2–1 to win championship
- 1999: Defeated Portland 3–0 to win championship
- 2003: Defeated Salem-Keizer 3–0 to win championship
- 2005: Defeated Vancouver 3–2 to win championship
- 2008: Defeated Salem-Keizer 3–1 to win championship
- 2010: Defeated Yakima 2–0 in semifinals; lost to Everett 2–1 in finals
- 2018: Defeated Everett 2–1 in semifinals; lost to Eugene 3–0 in finals
- 2019: Lost to Tri-City 2–1 in semifinals
- 2021: Lost to Eugene 3–1 in finals
- 2024: Defeated Vancouver 3-1 to win championship

== Logos and uniforms ==
The team's colors are red, navy blue, light blue, and beige. In the 2006 offseason, the Indians began a process to redesign their logo and uniforms, looking to avoid the use of any American Indian imagery that might be perceived as derogatory. However, early in the process, the Spokane Nation contacted the team about offering their official support. In the process, the tribe gave permission to the team to adopt subtle and tasteful imagery, in order to pay homage to the team's history and new connection with the tribe. The cooperation included the creation of a secondary logo written in Salish, the traditional language of the Spokane.

== Roster ==
Spokane Indians roster
Players	Coaches/Other
Pitchers: 24 Everett Catlett; 20 Seth Clausen; 23 Isaiah Coupet; 41 Dylan Crooks; 10 Austin Emener; 25 Tyler Hampu; 27 Luke Hansel; 44 Yujanyer Herrera; 35 Angel Jimenez; 48 Lebarron Johnson Jr.; 22 Justin Loer; 34 Ismael Luciano; 47 Aiden May; 32 Alberto Pacheco; 29 Francis Rivera; 30 Jordy Vargas; Catchers: 28 Juan Castillo; 19 Alan Espinal; 34 Blake Penso; Infielders: 27 Derek Bernard; 1 Roldy Brito; 18 Wilder Dalis; 15 Ethan Hedges; 7 Kelvin Hidalgo; 14 Jacob Hinderleider; 4 Tommy Hopfe; 34 Tanner Thach; -- Blake Wright; Outfielders: 31 Max Belyeu; 44 Robert Calaz; 16 Lorenzo Carrier; 11 Clayton Gray; 27 Cameron Nelson	Manager: 21 Tom Sutaris; Coaches: 38 Blaine Beatty (pitching); 8 Tyler Ladendorf (performance); 9 Edgardo Lebron (bench); -- Allison Krajewski (performance); 60-day injured list: 11 Brody Brecht; 23 Antoine Jean (full season); 29 Jake Madden; 7-day injured list; * On Colorado Rockies 40-man roster; ~ Development list; # Rehab assignment; ∞ Reserve list; ‡ Restricted list; § Suspended list; † Temporarily inactive list; Roster updated September 5, 2026; Transactions; → More rosters: MiLB • Northwest League; → Colorado Rockies minor league players

== Notable alumni ==
Baseball Hall of Fame alumni

- Tommy Lasorda (1969–1971, manager) inducted 1997
- Duke Snider (1965, manager) inducted 1980
- Don Sutton (1968) inducted 1998
- Hoyt Wilhelm (1971) inducted 1985

Notable alumni

- Sandy Alomar Jr. (1984) 1990 MLB Rookie of the Year; 6-time MLB All Star
- Carlos Beltrán (1996) 1999 AL Rookie of the Year; 9-time MLB All Star
- Bruce Bochy (1989, manager) Manager: 4-time World Series Champion – San Francisco Giants (2010, 2012, 2014), Texas Rangers (2023)
- Bill Buckner (1969–1970) MLB All-Star; 1982 NL batting title
- Dolph Camilli (1948, manager) 2-time MLB All-Star; 1941, NL Most Valuable Player
- Ron Cey (1971) 6-time MLB All-Star
- Gino Cimoli (1965) MLB All-Star
- Matt Clement (1994) MLB All-Star
- Joey Cora (1985) MLB All-Star
- Roger Craig (1959)
- Chris Davis (2006) MLB All-Star; MLB home run leader: 2013, 2015
- Willie Davis (1960) 2 Time MLB All-Star; (1960) Minor League MVP
- Ron Fairly (1960) 2 Time MLB All-Star
- Neftalí Feliz, MLB All-Star
- Steve Garvey (1970) 10-time MLB All-Star; 1974 NL Most Valuable Player
- Zack Greinke (2002) 2009 AL Cy Young Award; 4-time MLB All-Star
- Brad Gulden
- Ian Kinsler (2003) 4-time MLB All Star
- Davey Lopes (1971) 4-time MLB All-Star
- Gary Matthews Jr. (1994) MLB All-Star
- Tony Mullane (1902)
- Jerry Narron, MLB player, coach, and manager
- Don Newcombe (1961) 4-time MLB All-Star; 1949 NL Rookie of the Year; 1956 NL Cy Young Award; 1956 NL Most Valuable Player
- Gorman Thomas (1972) MLB All-Star
- Roy White (1967) 2-time MLB All-Star
- Mitch Williams (1983) MLB All-Star
- Maury Wills (1959) 7-time MLB All-Star; 1962 NL Most Valuable Player
- Ned Yost (1978) manager: 2015 World Series Champion – Kansas City Royals

=== See also ===
- Spokane Indians players
- Spokane Hawks players (1937–1940)
