= Avista Stadium =

Athletic venue in Spokane Valley, Washington

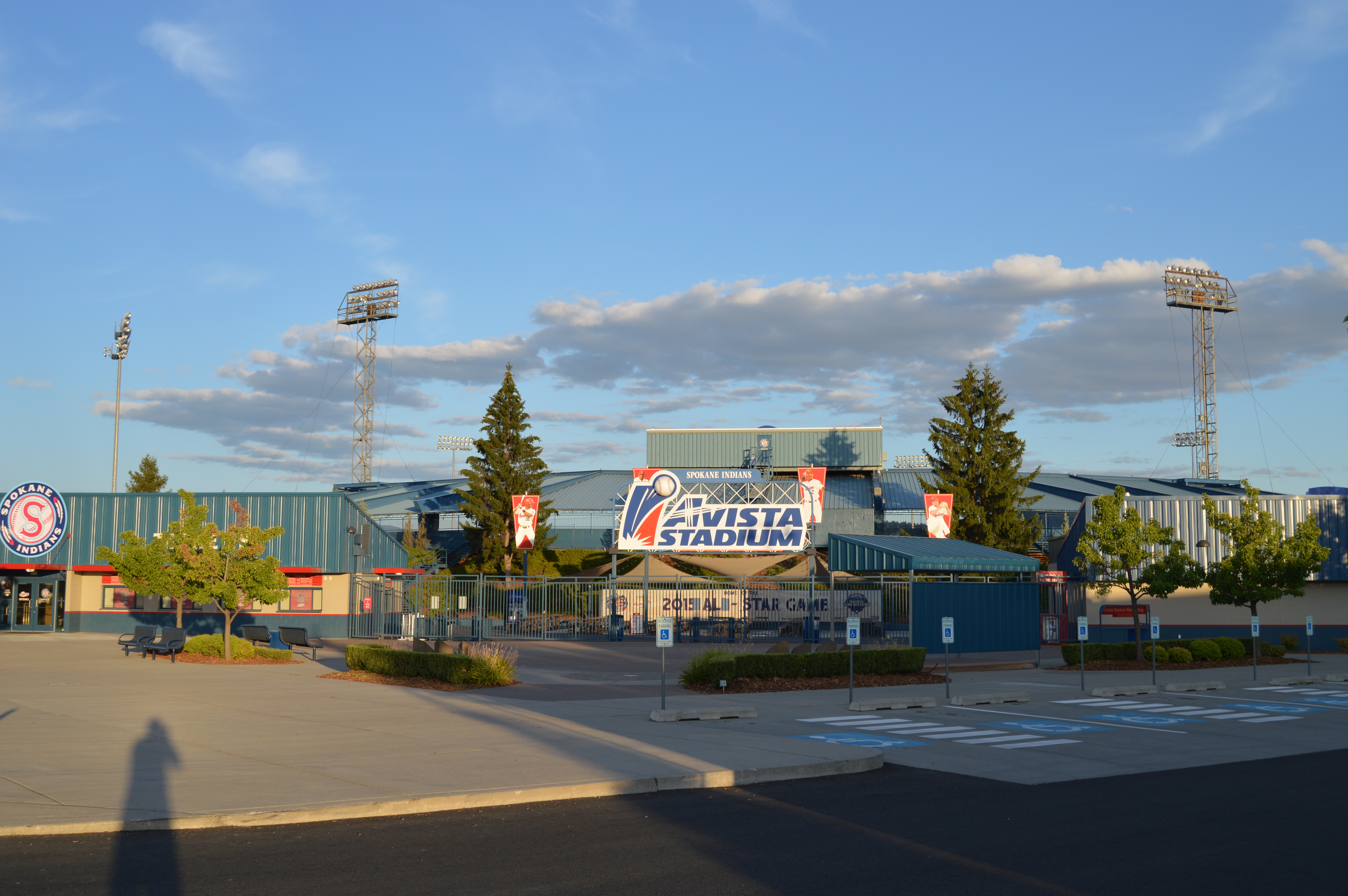
- View of exterior from northwest in 2015

- Location within the United States Location within Washington
- Former names: Seafirst Stadium (1994–1999); Fairgrounds Ballpark (1958–1993) (a.k.a. Indians Stadium)
- Address: 602 North Havana Street
- Location: Spokane Valley, Washington, U.S.
- Coordinates: 47.662°N 117.345°W
- Elevation: 1,920 ft (585 m)
- Owner: Spokane County
- Operator: Spokane County
- Capacity: 6,803
- Surface: Natural grass
- Field size: Left Field: 335 ft (102 m); Center Field: 398 ft (121 m); Right Field: 296 ft (90 m)
- Public transit: Spokane Transit Authority

Construction
- Groundbreaking: January 9, 1958
- Opened: April 29, 1958; 68 years ago
- Renovated: 1979, 1990s, 2007, 2008, 2013
- Cost: $550,000 ($6.14 million in 2025)
- Architects: Culler, Gale, Martell, & Norrie

Tenants
- Spokane Indians (PCL/NWL); 1958–present Spokane RiverHawks (WCCBL/PIL/WCL); 2005–2009; Gonzaga Bulldogs (NCAA) 2004–2006

Avista Stadium is a baseball park in the northwest United States, located in Spokane Valley, Washington. It is the home ballpark of the Spokane Indians, a minor league baseball team in the High-A Northwest League.

== History ==
Built in less than four months at the Interstate Fairgrounds, the stadium opened 68 years ago in 1958 and has a seating capacity of 6,803–large for Class A ballpark. The facility was built for Triple-A in the Pacific Coast League, which it hosted for 24 of its first 25 seasons. The parent club in 1958 was the Los Angeles Dodgers, who had just moved out west from Brooklyn and moved their PCL affiliate, the Los Angeles Angels, north to Spokane. They stayed for fourteen seasons, through 1971, then departed to New Mexico and became the Albuquerque Dukes.

After one year in the short-season Northwest League as a Dodger affiliate, the Triple-A PCL returned in 1973, from Portland, as the Texas Rangers' top affiliate. The Milwaukee Brewers became the Indians' parent club in 1976, the Seattle Mariners in 1979, and the California Angels in 1982. The Indians left for Las Vegas after the 1982 season and the NWL returned in 1983 and has remained for over three decades.

The natural grass field is aligned southeast (home plate to second base), at an approximate elevation of 1,920 feet (585 m) above sea level.

In 2023, the stadium finalized a plan to renovate the stadium and field to satisfy Major League Baseball (MLB) regulations by the deadline of Opening Day 2025. The $17 million project would be funded by Spokane County ($5.5 million up to $8 million), the City of Spokane Valley ($2.5 million), the State of Washington ($5.8 million), and other private funding ($3 million).

During the early hours of September 5, 2025, the main concession building was destroyed by fire.

== Earlier ballparks ==
The preceding minor league ballpark in Spokane was Ferris Field, which was about a mile (1½ km) west, on the west side of Playfair Race Course. Named for city attorney George M. Ferris, its original wooden grandstand was built in 1936. Ferris was a former player and manager for the Indians who secured funding from the Works Progress Administration to build it. A fire in October 1948 damaged most of the grandstands, and it was rebuilt using concrete and steel in the spring of 1949.

Earlier baseball venues in Spokane were Recreation Park (47.668°N 117.368°W), Natatorium Park (47.673°N 117.459°W), and the original Twickenham Park.

In 1954, four-year-old Memorial Stadium (later Joe Albi Stadium) was considered as a potential minor league baseball venue.

== Other uses ==
For three seasons beginning in 2004, the Gonzaga Bulldogs used the stadium as its home venue while its current venue was being built. Their former ballpark was displaced by the new McCarthey Athletic Center.

In 2011, the Spokane Chiefs hosted the first outdoor game in Western Hockey League history at Avista Stadium on January 15; the home team routed the Kootenay Ice 11–2.

== Stadium name ==
Naming rights were purchased in 1998 (and the stadium renamed after the 1999 season) by Avista, the Spokane-based utility founded in 1889 as Washington Water Power Company. The venue's first corporate name was Seafirst Stadium, from 1994 through 1999.
