= Longacres Mile Stakes =

- Class: Listed
- Location: Emerald Downs; Auburn, Washington, USA
- Inaugurated: 1935
- Race type: Thoroughbred - Flat racing
- Website: www.emeralddowns.com

Race information
- Distance: 1 mile (8 furlongs)
- Surface: Dirt
- Track: left-handed
- Qualification: Three-year-olds and up
- Weight: Weight for Age with allowances
- Purse: $125,000

The Longacres Mile Stakes is an American Thoroughbred horse race generally held in August at Emerald Downs in Auburn, Washington. Formerly run under handicap conditions, the race is open to horses three years of age and older and is run on dirt over a distance of one mile (eight furlongs). It is the showpiece of the Emerald Downs race meeting.

Created by Joe Gottstein for the Longacres racetrack's third season, the Longacres Mile Handicap ran at that Renton, Washington track from 1935 to 1992. From 1993 to 1995 the race held its graded status as the Budweiser Mile at Yakima Meadows. Since 1996 the venue has been Emerald Downs.

In 2008, Jennifer Whitaker became the first female jockey (aboard Wasserman) to win the Longacres Mile.

The event was downgraded to Listed status in 2022, when it changed from a handicap race to a Weight for Age event with allowances.

Both the 2023 and 2024 Longacres Miles were won by owner Ken Alhadeff, the grandson of race creator and former Longacres owner Joe Gottstein, under the name of Elttaes Stable ("Seattle" spelled backwards). Elttaes Stable also won the Longacres Mile in 1942, 1967 and 1968 when the stable was owned by Gottstein.

== Records ==
Speed record:

- 1:32.90 - Point Piper (2016) (Washington state record)

Most wins:

- 2 - Amble In (1946, 1948)
- 2 - Trooper Seven (1980, 1981)
- 2 - Simply Majestic (1988, 1989)
- 2 - Stryker Phd (2014, 2015)
- 2 - Five Star General (2023, 2024)

Most wins by a jockey:

- 5 - Gary Baze (1980, 1981, 1985, 1987, 1993)

Most wins by a trainer:

- 5 - Jim Penney (1973, 1977, 2000, 2002, 2006)

Most wins by an owner:

- 5 - Elttaes Stable (1942, 1967, 1968, 2023, 2024)

== Winners ==
2025 Emerald Downs Media Guide

Year	Winner	Age	Jockey	Trainer	Owner	Time	Purse$	Win$
2026	Adios Jojo	4	Kevin Orozco	Howard Gibson	Chad and Josh	1:35.29	$125,000	$68,750
2025	Arrowthegreat	5	Manuel Americano	Dan Blacker	Radley Equine, Inc.	1:34.41	$125,000	$68,750
2024	Five Star General	8	Joe Bravo	Grant Forster	Elttaes Stable (Ken Alhadeff)	1:34.98	$150,000	$82,500
2023	Five Star General	7	Joe Bravo	Grant Forster	Elttaes Stable (Ken Alhadeff)	1:34.73	$150,000	$82,500
2022	Slew's Tiz Whiz	4	Jose Zunino	Tom Wenzel	K D Thoroughbreds	1:34.46	$150,000	$82,500
2021	Background	4	Rocco Bowen	Michael Puhich	Giddyup Stable, LLC	1:36.67	$100,000	$53,000
2020	Anothertwistafate	4	Juan Gutierrez	Blaine Wright	Peter Redekop	1:34.10	$100,000	$53,000
2019	Law Abidin Citizen	5	Abel Cedillo	Mark Glatt	Agnew/Schneider/Xitco	1:34.08	$200,000	$96,800
2018	Barkley	5	Javier Matias	Howard E. Belvoir	Rising Star Stable, LLC	1:34.93	$200,000	$108,900
2017	Gold Rush Dancer	4	Evin Roman	Vann T. Belvoir	John E. Parker	1:33.85	$200,000	$110,000
2016	Point Piper	6	Mario Gutierrez	Jerry Hollendorfer	Hollendorfer/Gatto/Russo	1:32.90	$200,000	$110,000
2015	Stryker Phd	6	Leslie Mawing	Larry D. Ross	Jim & Mona Hour	1:34.06	$200,000	$110,000
2014	Stryker Phd	5	Leslie Mawing	Larry D. Ross	Jim & Mona Hour	1:33.67	$200,000	$110,000
2013	Herbie D	5	Amadeo Perez	Robert Gilker	George Robbins/Darcia Doman	1:35.12	$200,000	$110,000
2012	Taylor Said	4	Mario Gutierrez	Michael Puhich	N American Tbred Horse Co.	1:33.79	$200,000	$110,000
2011	Awesome Gem	8	David Flores	Craig M. Dollase	West Point Thoroughbreds	1:34.80	$200,000	$110,000
2010	Noosa Beach	4	Ricky Frazier	Doris A. Harwood	Jeffrey O. Harwood	1:34.80	$203,125	$96,250
2009	Assessment	5	Gallyn Mitchell	Howard E. Belvoir	Tice Ranch Stables	1:33.40	$294,375	$165,000
2008	Wasserman	6	Jennifer Whitaker	Howard E. Belvoir	Howard E. Belvoir	1:35.00	$250,000	$137,500
2007	The Great Face	5	Juan Gutierrez	Tom Wenzel	Ron Crockett Inc.	1:35.40	$391,250	$220,000
2006	Flamethrowintexan	5	Ricky Frazier	Jim Penney	Grasshopper Stable	1:34.40	$250,000	$137,500
2005	No Giveaway	4	Juan Gutierrez	Grant T. Forster	Herman Sarkowsky	1:35.60	$250,000	$137,500
2004	Adreamisborn	5	Russell Baze	Jerry Hollendorfer	Franks Farms	1:34.80	$250,000	$137,500
2003	Sky Jack	7	Russell Baze	Douglas F. O'Neill	Ren-Mar Thoroughbreds	1:33.00	$250,000	$137,500
2002	Sabertooth	4	Nathan Chaves	Jim Penney	Bob & Bruce Sparling	1:34.60	$250,000	$137,500
2001	Irisheyesareflying	4	Iggy Puglisi	John K. Dolan	Dolan, Graham & Taylor	1:35.40	$250,000	$137,500
2000	Edneator	4	Gallyn Mitchell	Jim Penney	Homestretch Farm	1:33.20	$250,000	$137,500
1999	Budroyale	6	Garrett Gomez	Ted H. West	Jeffrey Sengara	1:34.60	$250,000	$137,500
1998	Wild Wonder	4	Eddie Delahoussaye	Gregory G. Gilchrist	V.H.W. Stables	1:33.20	$200,000	$110,000
1997	Kid Katabatic	4	Chris Loseth	Shauna Van Oostdam	S/K Ferguson & M/L Russell	1:34.20	$200,000	$110,000
1996	Isitingood	5	David Flores	Bob Baffert	Mike E. Pegram/Terry Henn	1:35.60	$200,000	$110,000
1995	L.J. Express	5	Mike Allen	Rod Gibson	Homer R. Gibson/Judy Parrish	1:34.60	$84,100	$50,350
1994	Want A Winner	4	Vann T. Belvoir	Charles Gibson	Larry & Veralene Hillis	1:35.20	$75,000	$48,250
1993	Adventuresome Love	7	Gary Baze	Janet Wig	Wolf's Hollow Farm	1:34.60	$81,800	$48,050
1992	Bolulight	4	Ron Hansen	Peter Gregory	Empire Farms	1:34.00	$293,800	$181,300
1991	Louis Cyphre	5	Gary L. Stevens	Robert J. Frankel	Edmund A. Gann	1:36.00	$291,000	$178,500
1990	Snipledo	5	James Corral	Marion L. Smith	Robert Resoff	1:35.60	$300,200	$187,600
1989	Simply Majestic	5	Ron Hansen	John Parisella	Theodore M. Sabarese	1:34.20	$245,000	$154,000
1988	Simply Majestic	4	Russell Baze	Robert J. Frankel	Theodore M. Sabarese	1:33.80	$237,800	$147,800
1987	Judge Angelucci	4	Gary Baze	Charles E. Whittingham	Olin B. Gentry	1:34.20	$240,000	$150,000
1986	Skywalker	4	Laffit Pincay Jr.	Michael C. Whittingham	Oak Cliff Stable	1:34.20	$290,000	$177,000
1985	Chum Salmon	5	Gary Baze	Larry D. Ross	Chum Salmon Stable	1:34.20	$244,500	$150,000
1984	Travelling Victor	5	Chris Loseth	Robert J. Anderson	Russell J. Bennett	1:34.80	$182,500	$115,000
1983	Chinook Pass	4	Laffit Pincay Jr.	Laurie Anderson	Hi Yu Stable	1:35.60	$182,500	$115,000
1982	Pompeii Court	5	Sandy Hawley	Laurie Anderson	Marcel Crowe / Steve Lewyk	1:35.60	$159,750	$100,000
1981	Trooper Seven	5	Gary Baze	Eugene W. Zeren	Eugene W. Zeren	1:35.40	$160,400	$100,650
1980	Trooper Seven	4	Gary Baze	Eugene W. Zeren	Eugene W. Zeren	1:34.40	$125,700	$78,200
1979	Always Gallant	5	Darrel McHargue	David G. LaCroix	Joseph W. LaCroix	1:33.80	$125,700	$79,500
1978	Bad'N Big	4	Bill Shoemaker	Richard E. Mandella	Mr. & Mrs. Buck Wynne Jr.	1:34.00	$122,500	$75,000
1977	Theologist	4	Bryson Cooper	Jim Penney	J. & R. Penney / A. & D. Archer	1:38.40	$103,500	$65,000
1976	Yu Wipi	4	Sandy Hawley	Robert J. Frankel	Fantasy Stable, et al.	1:34.80	$91,500	$55,500
1975	Jim	5	Alan Cuthbertson	Jim Halket	Can Am Stable	1:37.00	$64,000	$39,500
1974	Times Rush	6	Basil Frazier	William McMeans	Salmon River Ranch	1:35.20	$64,900	$38,400
1973	Silver Mallet	5	Larry Pierce	Jim Penney	White Swan/Tamarack Stables	1:34.00	$49,950	$30,250
1972	Red Wind	4	Richard Hollingsworth	Glen Williams	Metropole Stable	1:34.00	$45,900	$28,650
1971	Pitch Out	5	Joseph Baze	Marion L. Smith	S. J. Agnew	1:35.80	$47,150	$31,400
1970	Silver Double	4	John Broomfield	Jim Hill	G-R Stables	1:35.80	$46,350	$30,600
1969	Praise Jay	5	Jack Leonard	William C. Holmes	John Hudspeth	1:34.80	$45,300	$29,550
1968	Steel Blade	5	Alvaro Pineda	Darrell F. Cannon	Elttaes Farm (Morris J. Alhadeff family)	1:37.60	$44,700	$28,950
1967	King's Favor	4	Johnny Sellers	Darrell F. Cannon	Elttaes Farm (Morris J. Alhadeff family)	1:34.60	$31,200	$22,200
1966	Aurelius	5	Robert Jennings	Melvin F. Stute	Wilbur Stadelman	1:36.40	$31,450	$22,450
1965	Siempre	4	Robert Jennings	C. F. Murphy	Kjell Qvale & Reynold Johnson	1:34.60	$30,725	$20,725
1964	Viking Spirit	4	Johnny Longden	James I. Nazworthy	Thomas E. Brittingham III	1:34.40	$31,350	$21,350
1963	Full Regalia	4	Jim Craswell	George D. McIvor	Big Six Stable/Solomon/Yackel	1:37.40	$33,250	$23,200
1962	Harpie	5	Johnny Longden	Earl Mitchell	Desilu, Star Stable & Johnson	1:35.60	$34,550	$24,550
1961	Sparrow Castle	4	Jack Leonard	Glen Williams	Mr. & Mrs. David Brazier	1:35.20	$34,150	$24,150
1960	Doctrinaire	4	George Tanaguchi	Warren R. Stute	Wilbur Stadelman	1:38.00	$24,675	$14,675
1959	Gigantic	8	Lloyd Cowie	William Findlay	Amcan Acres Ltd.	1:34.80	$25,000	$14,675
1958	Collaborator	3	Don Pierce	Leighton L. Dorsett	Mrs. George C. Newell	1:35.20	$24,625	$14,675
1957	Miracle Escort	4	Glen Dixon	Art Linker	Mr. & Mrs. Art Linker	1:35.00	$19,675	$9,675
1956	Hula Boola	4	Jack Palmer	Lloyd A. Lawson	Dino Lozzi	1:37.20	$19,675	$9,675
1955	Quality Quest	4	Bill Hartack	Jack Russell	W. H. Wellburn	1:34.40	$25,900	$15,625
1954	Greek Runner	7	Grant Zufelt	Paul Lycan	Golden Pine Stable	1:35.60	$12,775	$9,775
1953	Ocean Mist	5	Ray Fugate	Jim Mihalcik	C & S Stable	1:36.40	$12,325	$12,325
1952	Eddie's Boy	4	Gilbert Hernandez	J. D. Kermode	J. D. Kermode	1:37.60	$12,925	$9,925
1951	Little Rollo	8	Henry Matthews	Tom Bellos	Braemar Stable	1:35.60	$12,050	$9,050
1950	Two And Twenty	4	Eddie Arcaro	Frank Brewster	Dorothy Brewster	1:35.80	$12,550	$12,700
1949	Blue Tiger	6	Delmar Jones	Rhodes Donnell	C. J. Sebastian	1:35.40	$18,200	$13,700
1948	Amble In	5	Noel Richardson	Allen B. Drumheller	Mrs. I. J. Levine	1:35.60	$23,450	$17,450
1947	Hank H.	4	Charlie Ralls	Allen B. Drumheller	Allen B. Drumheller	1:36.00	$24,900	$18,900
1946	Amble In	3	Noel Richardson	Francis Irwin Keller	K & L Stable	1:35.00	$23,850	$17,850
1945	Prince Ernest	5	Frank Miliman	Norman R. McLeod	Mrs. B. N. Hutchinson	1:39.00	$24,150	$18,150
1944	Hard Twist	4	Lyle Bassett	L. B. "Breezy" Cox	G. Peter	1:36.20	$11,770	$8,770
1943	Race not held							
1942	Lavengro	7	Charlie Ralls	Allen B. Drumheller	Elttaes Stable	1:35.60	$12,380	$9,380
1941	Campus Fusser	3	Ferrill Zufelt	Allen B. Drumheller	B. N. Hutchinson	1:35.60	$11,725	$8,725
1940	Pala Squaw	3	Otto Grohs	Francis Irwin Keller	Al Rosenberg	1:36.40	$12,050	$9,050
1939	Brief Moment	3	Douglas Dodson	Walter Nielson	Needmore Stable	1:36.80	$13,500	$10,050
1938	Triplane	3	Ralph Neves	Walter Sims	Allen B. Drumheller	1:36.80	$12,325	$9,325
1937	Sally's Booter	5	Tim Sena	Joseph H. Luddy	Athony Puccinelli	1:37.00	$11,425	$8,425
1936	Exotude	4	Alan Gray	Earl H. Beezley	Hynes & Beezley	1:35.60	$11,225	$8,225
1935	Coldwater	4	Willie Robertson	Richard F. Carman Jr.	Mrs. Richard F. Carman Jr.	1:37.60	$12,350	$9,350
