= Emerald Downs =

Thoroughbred racetrack in Auburn, Washington

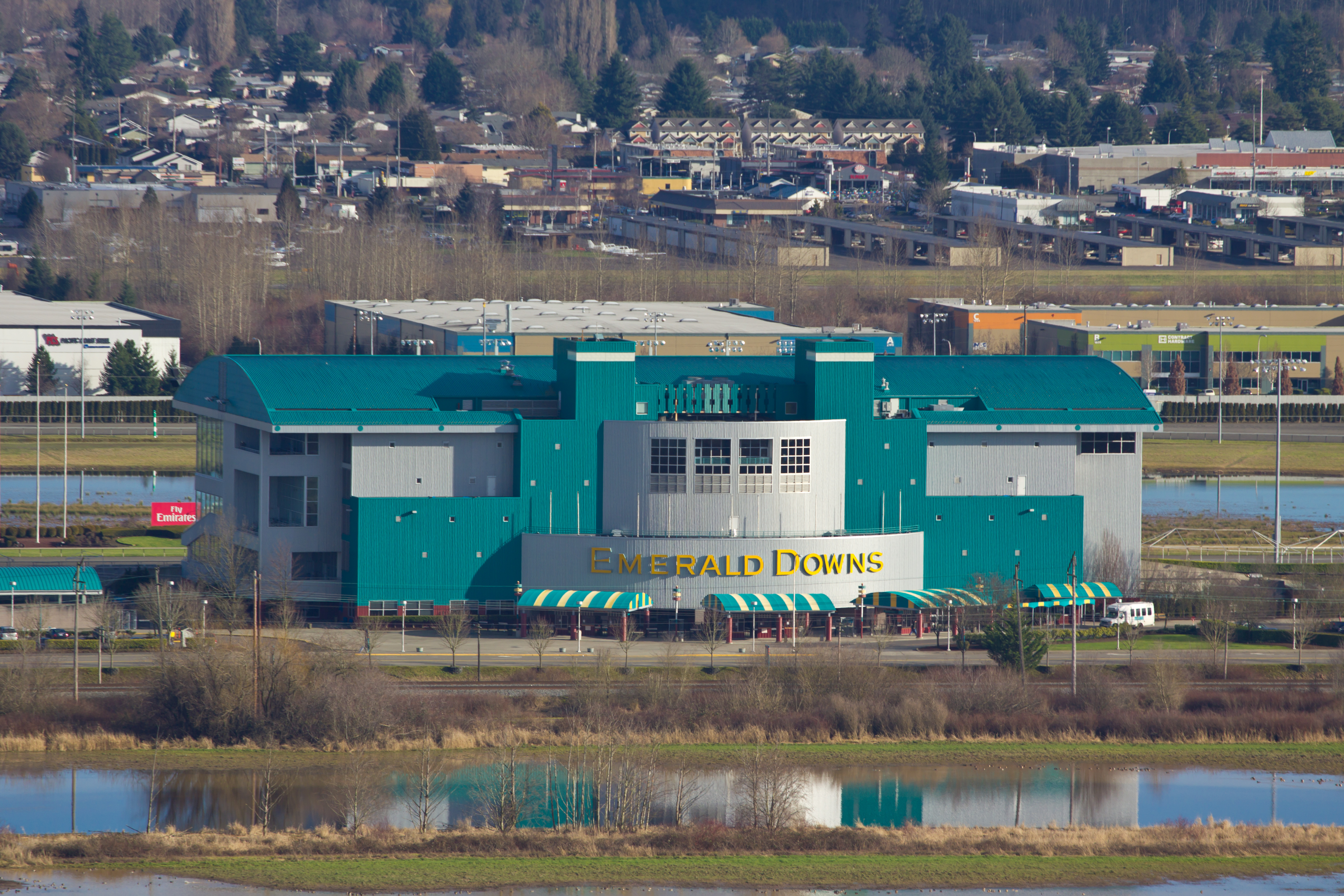
- Interactive map of Emerald Downs
- Location: Auburn, Washington, United States
- Coordinates: 47°19′44″N 122°14′02″W
- Owned by: Muckleshoot Indian Tribe
- Date opened: June 20, 1996
- Course type: Thoroughbred flat racing
- Notable races: Longacres Mile

Emerald Downs is a Thoroughbred racetrack in Auburn, Washington, located a half mile east of Highway 167. It is named after Seattle, the Emerald City.

== History ==
Emerald Downs first opened its doors to race fans on June 20, 1996, with the inaugural 100-day meet running through November 4. It replaced Longacres Racetrack, which closed in September 1992 after sixty seasons of racing. Following the closure of Longacres, racing was not held in Western Washington from 1993 to 1995. However, Thoroughbred racing continued at Yakima Meadows and Playfair Race Course in Spokane during this time. Emerald Downs operated as a Limited Partnership from 1996 to 2015, with a group of investors led by Ron Crockett. In 2002, the land where Emerald Downs is situated was purchased by the Muckleshoot Indian Tribe for roughly $70 million. The Tribe purchased the track buildings and facilities and formed Emerald Downs Racing LLC in 2015. The Tribe has made a number of improvements since taking over the operation including a 1,150 square feet (107 m^{2}) infield big screen. Emerald Downs celebrated its 20th anniversary Monday, June 20, 2016, with a special night of racing featuring many of the stars from the track's first two decades.

== Physical attributes ==
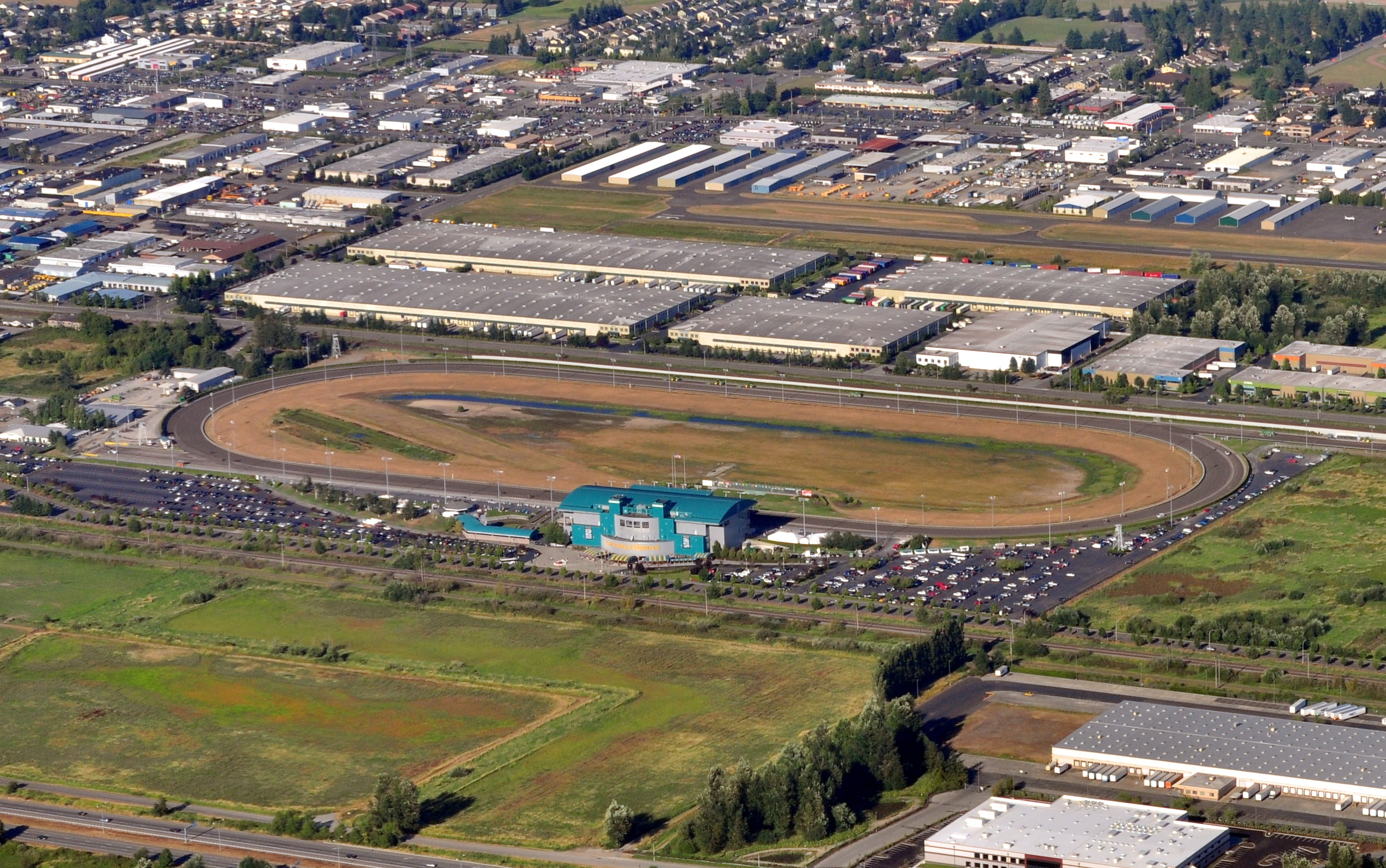
Aerial view from west-southwest, 2013

=== The track ===
The Emerald Downs track is a one-mile (1.6 km) oval with a commanding view of Mount Rainier. The track surface itself is made of geo-textile fabric, washed rock, coarse sand, and one-component track material. However, there is no turf course. The tote board is located in the center of the oval track.

=== The grandstand ===
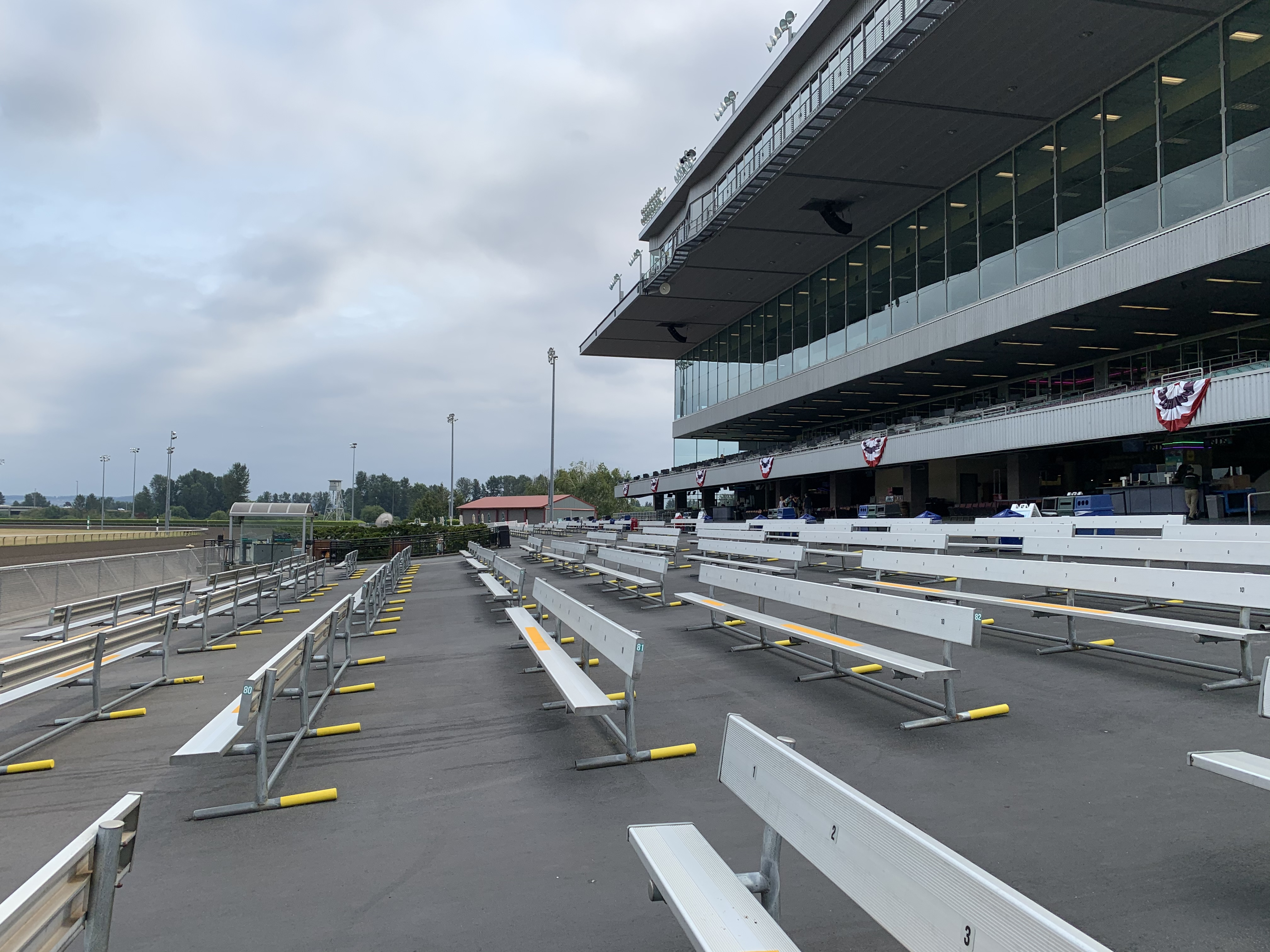
Grandstand with general admission seating on track level

The Emerald Downs Grandstand is a modern racetrack facility designed by EwingCole. There is general admission seating on track level, including a grassy park area with free children's activities on weekends (weather permitting). Outside on the third floor are box and reserved seats in the grandstand, as well as box and reserved seats on the fifth floor indoor clubhouse.

Parimutuel windows are located on each floor to place wagers. There are eight food stands and six beverage services throughout the facility.

=== Paddock and saddling area ===
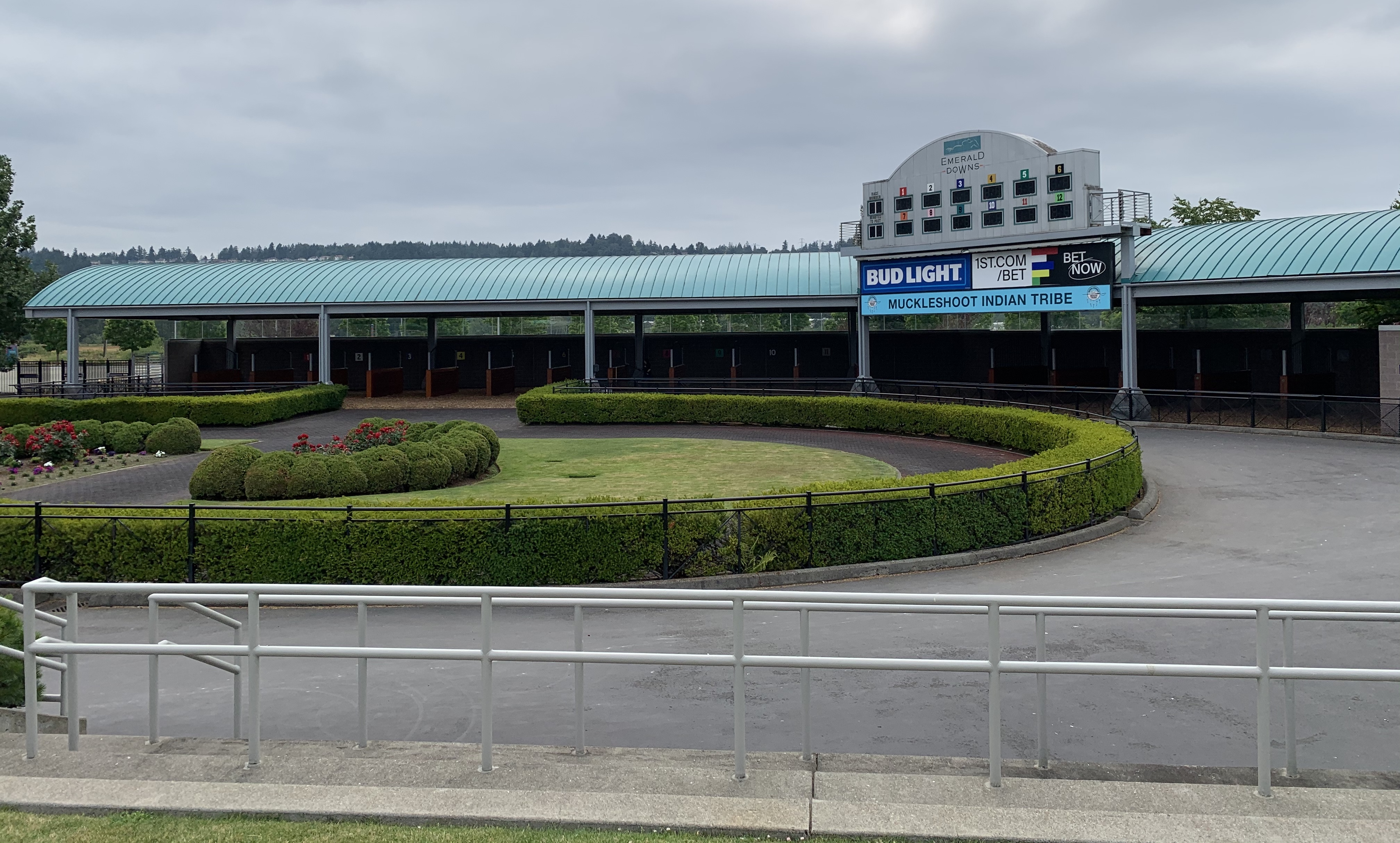
Paddock and covered saddling area

Beside the grandstand is a paddock and covered horse saddling area. Paved surfaces around the paddock and up to the saddling area provide spectators an opportunity to view the horses when the horses are in these areas. Prior to the start of each race, horses are walked through the paddock into the saddling area, walked around the saddling area a few times and their saddles put on. Once the horses are saddled, they are walked once around the paddock before the jockey mounts the horse and the horses are walked out to the race track.

=== Washington Racing Hall of Fame ===
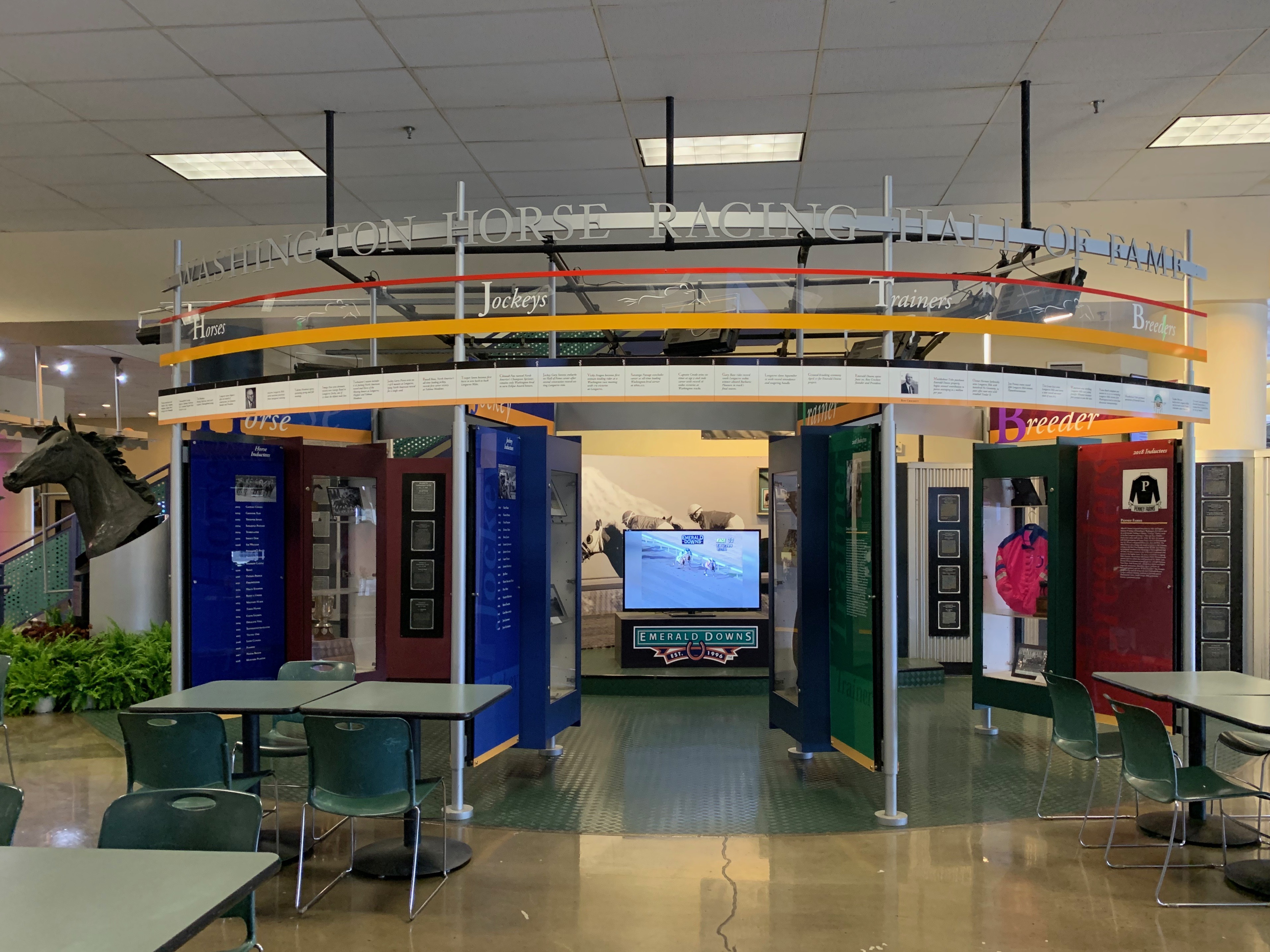
Washington Racing Hall of Fame

The Washington Horse Racing Hall of Fame is housed on the track level of the grandstand. Inductees are recognized for their accomplishments in five main categories: jockeys, trainers, horses, breeders, or lifetime achievement. The inductees for each class, year, of inductees are determined by a combination of the media, Emerald Downs, the Washington Thoroughbred Breeders and Owners Association, and the National Horsemen's Benevolent and Protective Association. Emerald Downs shares videos highlighting various hall of fame inductees and their induction ceremony on its YouTube channel.

A number of individuals inducted into this hall of fame have also been recognized at the Washington state level for sports excellence and are inductees in the State of Washington Sports Hall of Fame as well. These individuals include Basil James, Joe Gottstein, Russell Baze, and Albert Johnson.

== Racing ==
Emerald Downs hosts live Thoroughbred racing during the spring and summer. Races are run Friday through Sunday during the summer months. The tracks biggest race is the Longacres Mile.

The first Quarter Horse race in track history was held in 2010. In 2011, Emerald Downs added a major Quarter Horse stakes, the $60,000 Bank of America Emerald Championship Challenge Stakes run on Labor Day weekend.

Emerald Downs also hosts Indian Relay Racing every year during Father's Day Weekend.

=== Longacres Mile ===
Emerald Downs biggest race is the Longacres Mile Handicap, a listed event. The race was announced in June 1935 so Longacres founder Joe Gottstein could have a signature one mile (1.6 km) race. He felt the mile was an overlooked distance, neither a sprint nor an endurance run. In order to attract racers and attention, the purse was set at $10,000, instantly the largest staked one mile (1.6 km) race in the country (and it would remain so for more than 40 years).

As soon as the announcement was made, the first running of the race had 20 entrants; 16 actually started. The stakes attracted the owners of a New Orleans horse named Biff, grandson of Man o' War, who had just won $5000 in Chicago. Biff had the attention of everyone for weeks before the event and no owners would run their horses in preliminary races with him. Biff was first out of the gate but was stalked by Coldwater, a 20-1 longshot that wasn't regarded well. Near the end of the mile Biff was showing clear strain and Coldwater overtook him to win.

In 2008, locally owned and bred Wasserman took the Longacres Mile closing fast to win in a photo finish over horses shipped in to run the race. The 75th Longacres Mile was run on August 22, 2010. It was won by the betting favorite, Noosa Beach. Ridden by Ricky Frazier and trained by Doris Harwood for owner Jeff Harwood, the winner paid $5.60, $3.80 and $3.00. Jersey Town finished second, followed by the 2009 Mile champion, Assessment.

The 2011 Longacres Mile featured a showdown between defending champion Noosa Beach and multiple graded stakes-winning millionaire Awesome Gem. Awesome Gem took the lead near the wire, defeating Noosa Beach by 1 1/2 lengths. It was his 9th win in 46 career starts, boosting his earnings to over $2.6 Million. In 2012, jockey Mario Gutierrez became the first rider to sweep the Kentucky Derby and Longacres Mile in the same year, guiding I'll Have Another to wins in the Kentucky Derby and Preakness Stakes, and then taking the Mile aboard Canadian shipper Taylor Said.

In 2014–2015, Stryker Phd became the first horse to win the Longacres Mile in consecutive years at Emerald Downs. The 6-year-old Washington-bred gelding by Bertrando-Striking Scholar is owned by Jim and Mona Hour of Bellevue, Wash., trained by Larry Ross and ridden by Leslie Mawing.

=== Emerald Downs selected other races and inaugural date ===
- Cahill Road Stakes (1951)
- Emerald Distaff (1996)
- Emerald Downs Derby (1934)
- Gottstein Futurity (1940)
- Governor's Handicap (1933)
- Muckleshoot Tribal Classic (1942)
- Seattle Stakes (1934)
- Seattle Slew Handicap (1977)
- Washington Oaks (1980)
- T-Rex World Championship Races (2017)
