= Longacres =

Former thoroughbred racetrack in Renton, Washington, United States

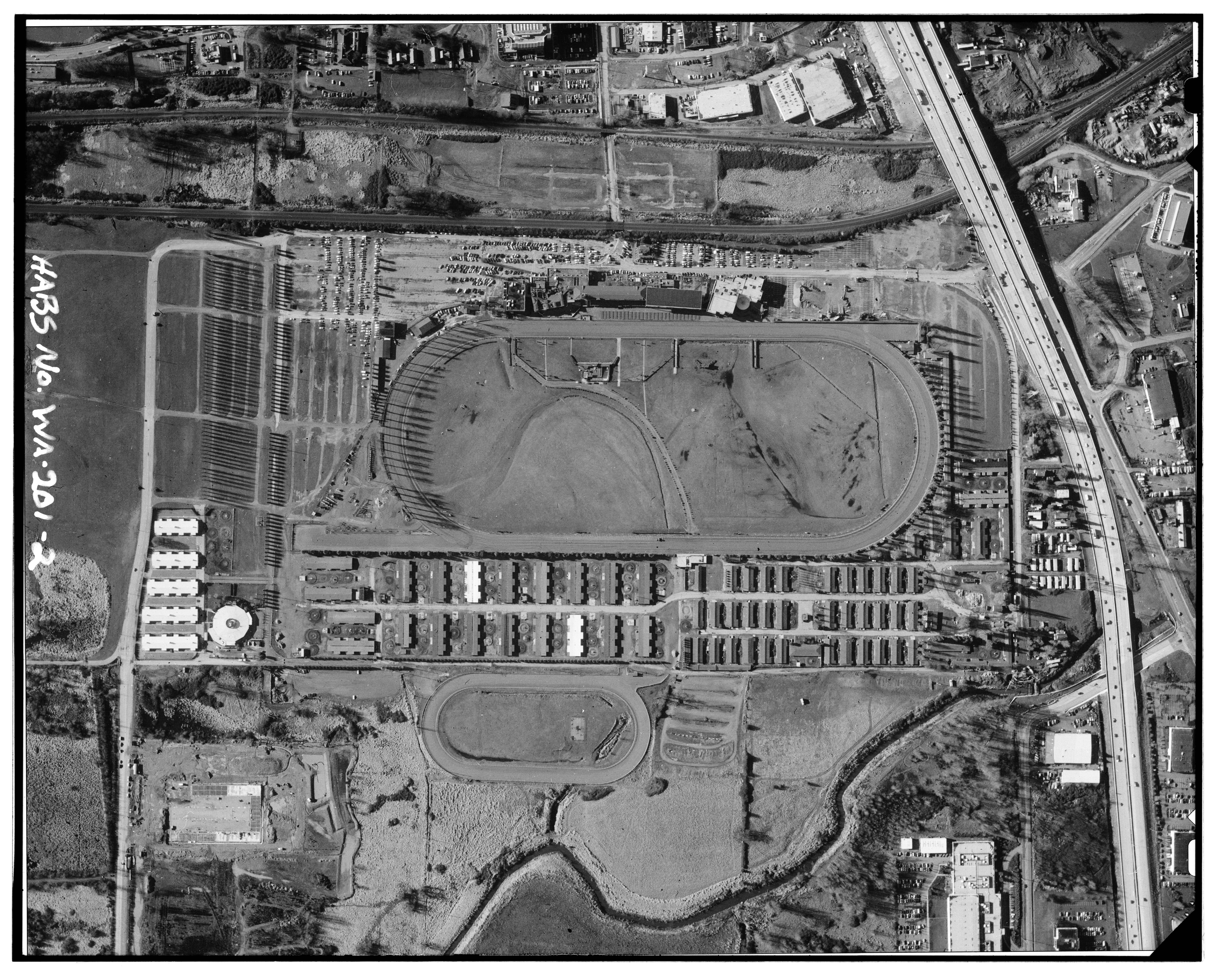
- Aerial view of Longacres in January 1991
- Interactive map of Longacres
- Location: Renton, Washington, U.S.
- Coordinates: 47°27′39″N 122°14′13″W
- Owned by: Broadacres (Gottstein/Alhadeff family)
- Operated by: Washington Jockey Club
- Date opened: August 3, 1933
- Date closed: September 21, 1992
- Course type: Flat
- Notable races: Longacres Mile Handicap; Gottstein Futurity

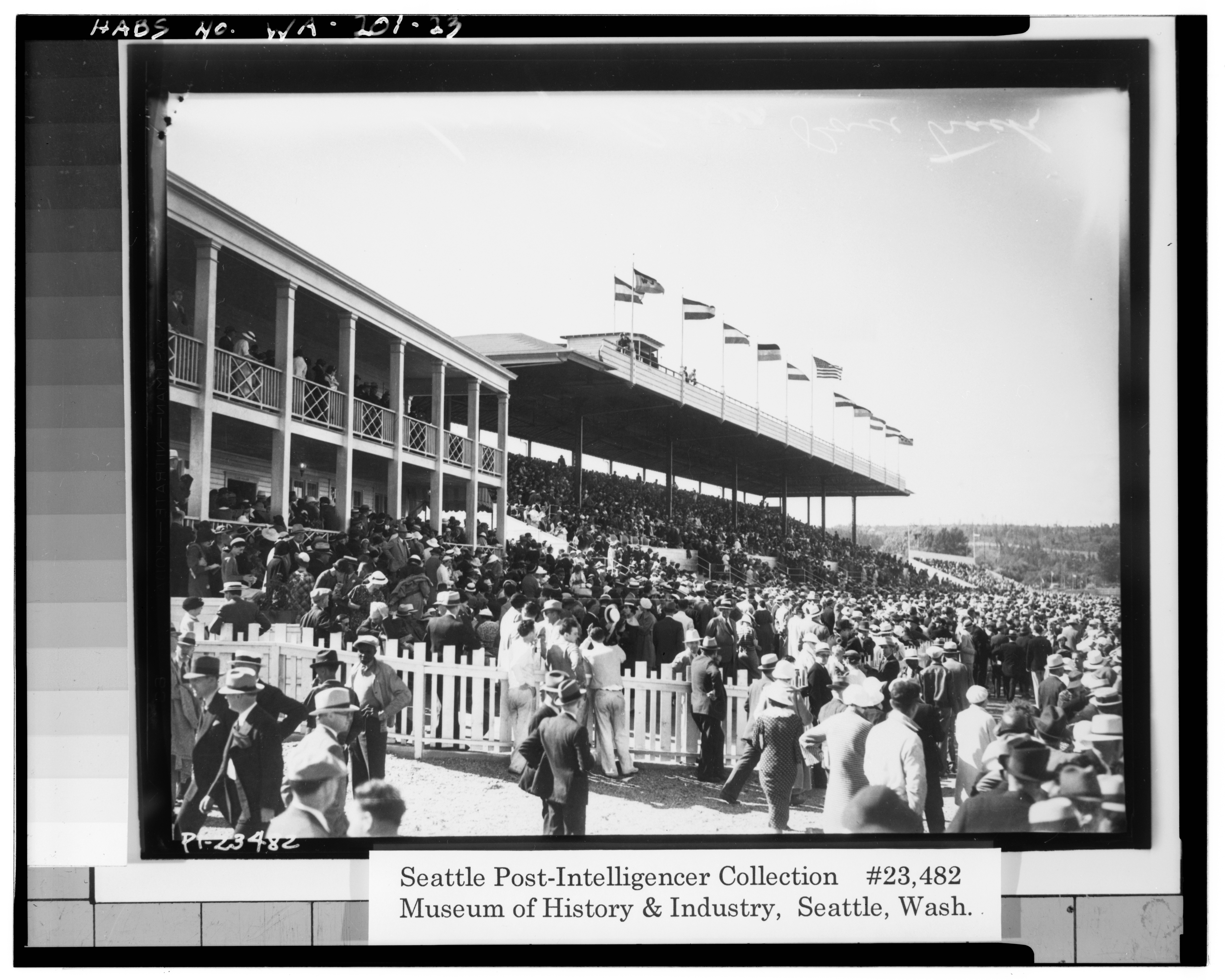
The main grandstand as seen in 1936–1937

Longacres was a Thoroughbred horse racetrack in Renton, Washington, United States. Owned by the Gottstein/Alhadeff family and operated by the Washington Jockey Club for the vast majority of its existence, the racetrack was the home of Thoroughbred racing in Western Washington from its opening in 1933 and was the longest continuously running track on the West Coast upon its closure. Until 1971, it was also the only place in Western Washington where gambling was legal. Notable races held at the racetrack include the Longacres Mile Handicap and the Gottstein Futurity.

After several years of losses due to increasing gambling and entertainment competition, the property was sold to Boeing in 1990. Boeing allowed the track to operate for two more years after the sale until the end of the 1992 season; the company demolished its structures in 1995. Boeing eventually built a new headquarters for its Commercial Airplanes division on the property along with a customer-training center; however, the company vacated the property and sold it in 2021 to Unico Properties. Seattle Sounders FC partnered with Unico to renovate the site for use as its headquarters and training facility, which opened in February 2024.

== History ==
=== Background ===
Before Longacres, two other racetracks had previously existed within the general vicinity of Seattle. The first, Seattle Race Course, was built in 1869 by Seattle saloon and brothel owner John Pinnell on land rented from pioneer Diana Collins; later known as the Seattle Driving Park after a hiatus from 1878 to 1883, it closed in 1892 to make way for development on the land.

The second racetrack, Meadows, was built south of the city in then-independent Georgetown by the King County Fair Association under the leadership of Republican politician A. T. Van de Vanter. It opened on August 9, 1902, with four events spectated by more than 3,000 visitors; the first event saw Pathmark defeat Daniel J. in a best-of-five series of one-mile heats to win a $1,000 purse. The racetrack held its first program on August 18; Royalty won the first running of its marquee event, the Seattle Derby, on August 23, winning a $1,000 purse before 5,000 spectators. Despite the racetrack's success leading it to host the region's first automobile race in 1905, it met its demise after the 1908 horse-racing season when the Washington State Legislature abolished gambling on horse races in February 1909 with the support of then-Governor Albert E. Mead, with the ban taking effect on June 12. The site of the racetrack was eventually redeveloped in 1928 as Boeing Field, Seattle's first municipal airport.

=== Founding and early years ===
The person most responsible for reintroducing horse racing in the state of Washington was Joseph Gottstein (1891–1971), a Seattle real estate magnate whose father, a liquor wholesaler who immigrated from Poland in 1879, had a racing stable and was a stakeholder in Meadows; Gottstein's passion for horse racing started when he was gifted his first Thoroughbred horse at the age of eight. After attending college at Brown University, he returned to Seattle and started investing in the city's downtown real estate market; it was during this time that he met and partnered with fellow magnate William Edris, who shared his passion for horse racing. Together, they lobbied the state legislature to legalize parimutuel betting starting in 1922. After years of lobbying, they got their wish in 1933 when House Bill 59, introduced by Democratic state representative Joseph B. Roberts, was signed into law by then-Governor Clarence Martin on March 3 after passing the state House and Senate respectively on February 20 and 23; the Washington Horse Racing Commission, a three-member commission appointed by the governor, was formed in the process.

Gottstein subsequently formed the Washington Jockey Club with architect B. Marcus Priteca and four other partners for the purposes of owning and operating a racetrack, with the club being issued a permit by the state commission for a one-mile track on June 20, 1933. The club intended to construct the racetrack on the site of the Mountain View Golf Club, a golf course situated along an old section of the Pacific Highway between Renton Junction and Orillia. However, future U.S. Senator Warren G. Magnuson, then a state Senator, subsequently discovered a 107-acre (43 ha) dairy farm at Renton Junction that was owned by the family of James R. Nelsen (1915–2013) and convinced the club to negotiate with them; both sides agreed to a 10-year lease three days later. As a sign of gratitude, Gottstein gave a small part of the property to Magnuson, who became an additional investor in the racetrack. With the racetrack's site confirmed, construction commenced immediately. The racetrack, designed by Priteca, was completed in only 28 days by a crew of 3,000 working nonstop; workers were willing to work long hours in the midst of the Great Depression. It opened on August 3 with around 11,000 in attendance and eight races planned that day; Vetsera won the first race, a five-and-a-half furlong affair with a $400 purse, with jockey Herbert "Little Nell" Simmons. The first race meet lasted 40 days, ending on September 17.

Seeking an event that would bring grandeur to the racetrack, the Washington Jockey Club announced a mile race with an initial purse of $10,000 on April 14, 1935. The race, later known as the Longacres Mile Handicap, first took place on August 24; longshot Coldwater finished ahead of favored contender Biff by a nose to pull off the upset and win the title in front of 12,000 spectators. The club then introduced the Washington Futurity (later renamed in 1971 as the Gottstein Futurity) in 1940 with an initial purse of $1,200 to encourage the breeding of Thoroughbreds within the state; Campus Fusser won the first running on August 18.

Edris became increasingly skeptical of the racetrack's financial success as the Great Depression lingered on; Gottstein had lost millions of dollars attempting to maintain the unprofitable racetrack. Eventually, on January 22, 1938, Gottstein announced that Edris would withdraw from the Washington Jockey Club and sell his stake in it to a group of Seattle businessmen led by William E. Boeing Gottstein eventually established Broadacres in 1948 to serve as owner of the family's properties, including the racetrack.

During World War II, the Washington Jockey Club was under pressure from the state commission to cancel all upcoming racing seasons at Longacres for the duration of the war. After Gottstein refused then-Governor Arthur B. Langlie's request to cancel the 1942 season, the state commission denied the club a license for one the following year; it was the only time in the racetrack's history where it did not hold a season. In the meantime, the U.S. Army erected an artillery barracks on the racetrack's infield, the former of which was converted to a cottage afterwards; it also placed anti-aircraft guns at the site to protect the nearby Boeing factory. The racetrack did not reopen until June 24, 1944, when it hosted a meet that lasted 51 days.

=== Decline ===
Joseph Gottstein retired from managing Longacres in 1963, handing over duties to son-in-law Morris Alhadeff, who had been part of the staff at the racetrack since 1947; Alhadeff became the track's president upon Gottstein's death at the age of 79 from lung cancer on January 1, 1971. Around the same time, gambling opportunists began to challenge the monopoly horse racing held on legal gambling in the state, with proponents of Greyhound racing among them; all attempts at its legalization between 1969 and 1975 were opposed with the help of horse-racing interests. However, with illegal gambling rampant throughout King County, the state legislature permitted bingo and raffles in 1971. The legislature then passed the Gambling Act (also known as House Bill 711) in 1973, which established the Washington State Gambling Commission to supervise legalized gambling activities within the state. Nevertheless, Longacres did not face serious pressure in the gambling space until the state legislature created a state lottery in 1982, after which point the racetrack began losing business to the lottery. Meanwhile, the racetrack faced competition in the entertainment space with the arrival of professional sports teams in Seattle, having to compete for media coverage with the likes of the NBA's SuperSonics, the NFL's Seahawks, and MLB's Mariners. (Note: Alhadeff was the original majority owner of the Seahawks, but he backed out due to a possible conflict of interest with Longacres; he was replaced by eight members of the Nordstrom family.) Longacres was successful such that it underwent expansions in 1972, 1974, 1978, 1982, and 1984; however, with the competition building up, attendance at the racetrack began to decline in 1984.

Attempts to stem the decline in the face of rising operating costs were made to no avail; in 1986, it instituted night racing on April 2 with the installation of lights, and it also experimented with a 146-day meeting, though the latter resulted in the first cancellation in the racetrack's history on October 26 due to safety concerns when a severe rainstorm created sloppy racing conditions during that day's set of races. After three years of continuous decline, the management at Longacres decided to enact a turnaround plan out of desperation in May 1987, intent on making the experience at the racetrack more family-friendly and approachable to casual spectators; this included training on betting and promotions that made the races secondary attractions. The racetrack even embraced its entertainment rivals, converting a restaurant into a room full of televisions intended for watching the local professional sports teams as well as the horse races. It also established satellite wagering in Bellingham on June 8, 1988, allowing betters to participate without being physically present.

The venture was moderately successful in its first year, with Longacres seeing a two-percent rise in attendance by the end of 1987. However, the gambling space became even more crowded with the passage of the federal Indian Gaming Regulatory Act in 1988, with the horse racing industry (and Longacres by extension) contending with the possibility of competing with gambling on Native American reservations in addition to the state lotteries. When Morris Alhadeff was named the track's chairman on November 30, sons Michael and Kenneth respectively assumed the track's president and executive vice president positions; they soon came to the conclusion that competing in an oversaturated gambling and entertainment market was unsustainable, especially with the track needing significant improvement projects to continue operating by 1995. The horse racing industry in general had suffered from the presence of the gambling competition; holding a 63-percent share in the state's legal gambling space in 1972, its share had collapsed to 8 percent by 1997 despite the state's gaming industry growing from $127 million to around $2 billion in the same time.

Furthermore, the area surrounding the racetrack had radically changed since its opening. When the racetrack first opened, it was in a rural area far from Seattle, but rapid development throughout its existence had resulted in the racetrack sitting on prime real estate with its proximity to Seattle–Tacoma International Airport and Interstates 5 and 405. Attempting to take advantage of a 1970 law giving tax breaks to farm and forest land owners based on their actual use, the racetrack's owners applied for open-space classification in October 1972 and in May 1973; they were denied both times. Eventually, in May 1979, the county's then-assessor, Harley Hoppe, designated 50 acres (20 ha) of stable land as farmland against the recommendation of his staff; this resulted in the reduction of the land's assessed value from $1.4 million to $299,000 and saved the racetrack's owners about $26,000 in taxes by May 1983. However, Hoppe's successor, Ruthe Ridder, repealed the classification in January 1984 under an order from the Washington State Department of Revenue, requiring the owners to pay $31,000 in back taxes. With its land becoming more valuable than its revenue, the Alhadeff family ultimately decided to sell the property.

=== Closure and redevelopment ===
External videos
- Final Race at Longacres on YouTube

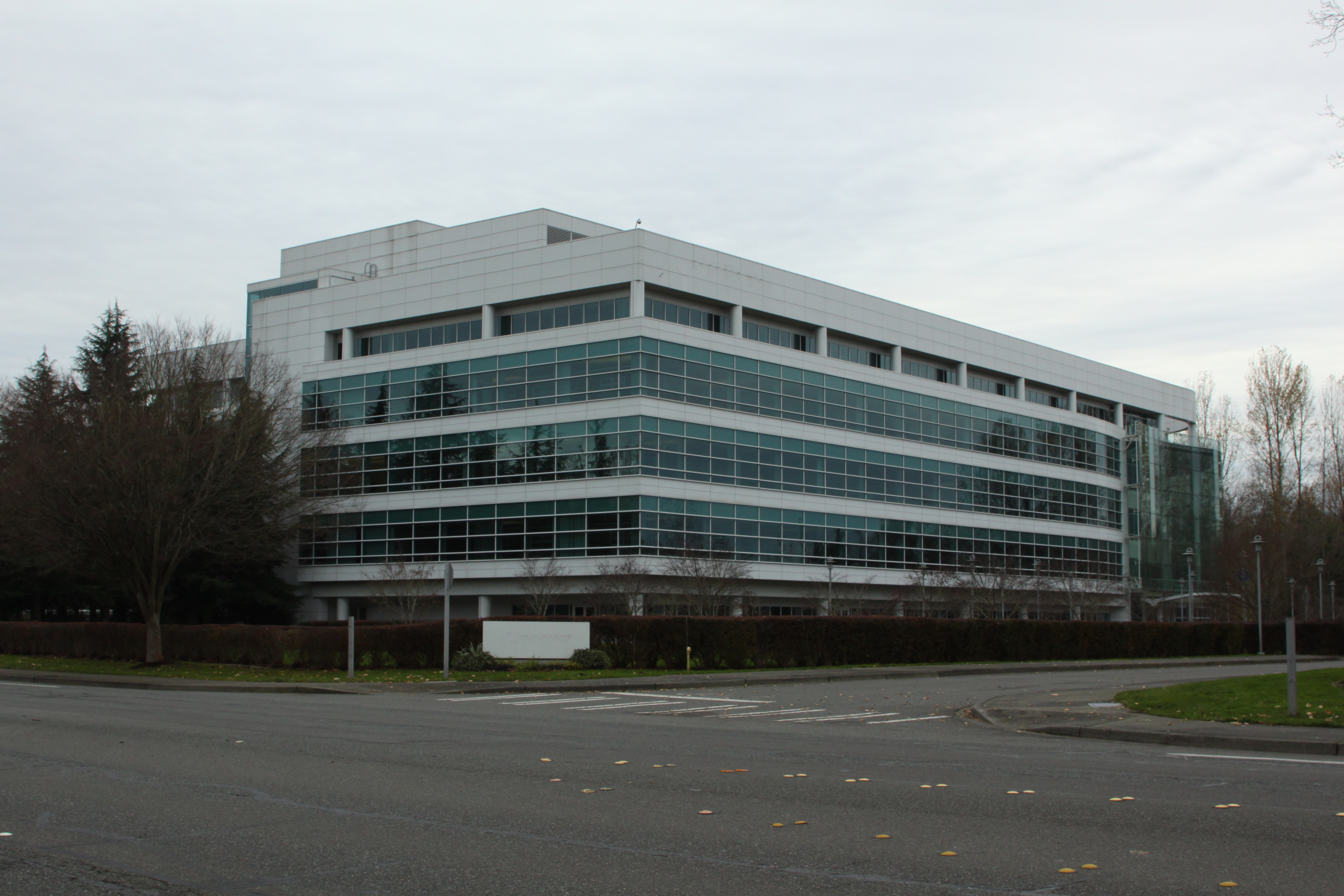
The building in 2021

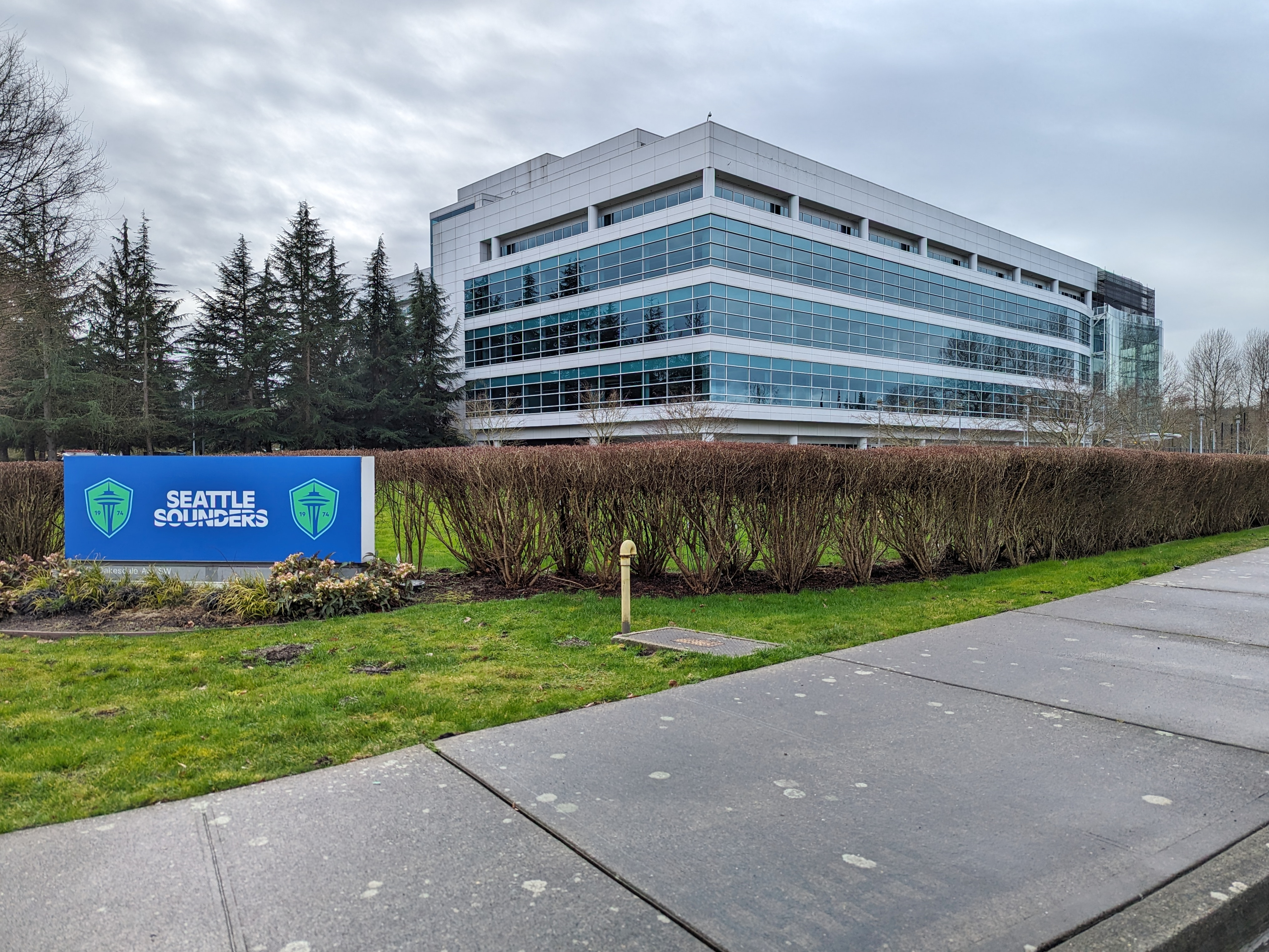
The building in 2024

The South Building, originally the headquarters of Boeing Commercial Airplanes before it was repurposed for Seattle Sounders FC.

On September 27, 1990, Kenneth Alhadeff announced that Broadacres had sold the Longacres site to Boeing; the company reportedly paid $80 million in the sale. An investor group led by Mark Dedomenico Sr.—a Thoroughbred owner, heart surgeon, and former overseer of the Golden Grain Macaroni Company—offered to buy Longacres from the Alhadeffs; the group never received a response. The racetrack was set to close on December 31, following the conclusion of a contract showing televised races from Playfair Race Course in Spokane and Yakima Meadows in Yakima, as the Alhadeffs had declined an offer from Boeing to operate it for up to three years as part of a transitional period. However, Boeing eventually reached an agreement with the non-profit Emerald Racing Association to operate the racetrack for two more years; the latter paid annual fees significantly below fair market value during that time.

Despite a last-ditch effort by the racetrack's supporters to keep it open for the 1993 season, the racetrack closed on September 21, 1992; Native Rustler won the final race under jockey Gary Stevens before a record 23,258 spectators, many of whom were involved at some point with the racetrack's operation throughout its history. Until that point, Longacres had been the longest continuously running track on the West Coast. The final Longacres Mile Handicap at the track, the 57th one overall, occurred on August 23, 1992; Bolulight prevailed over Ibero by a half-length to win the $293,800 purse in front of 17,182 spectators. The race was subsequently held at Yakima Meadows from 1993 to 1995 before moving to Emerald Downs in Auburn when that racetrack opened in 1996 as the new home of horse racing in Western Washington.

Meanwhile, on May 10, 1991, Boeing announced their intent to build an office park at the Longacres site, planning to develop the 212-acre (86 ha) site over a 12-year period. However, the company shelved much of the plans for the park in November aside from a $70 million, 600,000-square-foot (56,000 m^{2}) customer-training center located on a corner of the property; the center opened in 1993. While Boeing mulled over alternate options for the Longacres site, the company obtained permits from the city of Renton to demolish the racetrack structures in December 1994; demolition began immediately, with the process completed by the following year. The company eventually decided to move its Commercial Airplanes division onto the property with the construction of a $60 million, 300,000-square-foot (28,000 m^{2}) facility that opened in October 1998, vacating three buildings in Renton that had collectively served as the division's headquarters. Boeing subsequently leased 38,000 square feet (3,500 m^{2}) of the training center, later known as the North Building, to Alaska Airlines for flight training.

Undertaking heavy cost-cutting measures due to the COVID-19 pandemic and its resulting impact on aviation, Boeing mulled a potential sale of the property in October 2020, with the Commercial Airplanes division potentially moving to offices on the Plant 2 site or at the Everett plant. Boeing eventually ordered a clear-out of the campus in February 2021, officially listing it for sale on April 6 with no succeeding headquarters location identified; the company cited the viability of remote work in its decision. The company eventually sold it for $100 million to Seattle-based Unico Properties, who announced the transaction in a news release on December 17; Unico stated their intent for transit-oriented development on the site.

On February 16, 2022, Seattle Sounders FC announced that it had partnered with Unico to renovate the headquarters building (also known as the South Building) as its new headquarters and training facility; prior to the announcement, the former was located in Seattle's Pioneer Square before the COVID-19 pandemic, while the latter was at Starfire Sports in nearby Tukwila. Among the changes brought about by the renovation was the installation of four full-sized soccer fields and separate locker and weight rooms for the team's academy and Tacoma Defiance reserve team; the latter were designed without adornments like the ones for the first team to incentivize such developmental players to work towards a promotion to the first-team roster. The renovated complex was officially unveiled on February 13, 2024, less than two weeks before the start of the 2024 season; the facility was named the Providence Swedish Performance Center & Clubhouse two months later when the team's then-current jersey sponsor, Providence Health & Services, acquired its naming rights.

Concurrent with the Sounders deal, Unico had also reached a deal with Alaska Airlines in March 2023 to expand the latter's presence in the North Building to 107,000 square feet (9,900 m^{2}) while extending the lease by 20 years. Alaska Airlines then purchased the building outright from Unico for $86 million in May 2024, intending to convert the whole building into a consolidated company training center that serves pilots, flight attendants, and customer service personnel. The remodeled North Building opened on January 29, 2026, replacing five facilities near the airline's headquarters in SeaTac; it includes several flight simulators, mockups of airline facilities, and inflated evacuation slides for training.
