= Playfair Race Course =

Horse race course

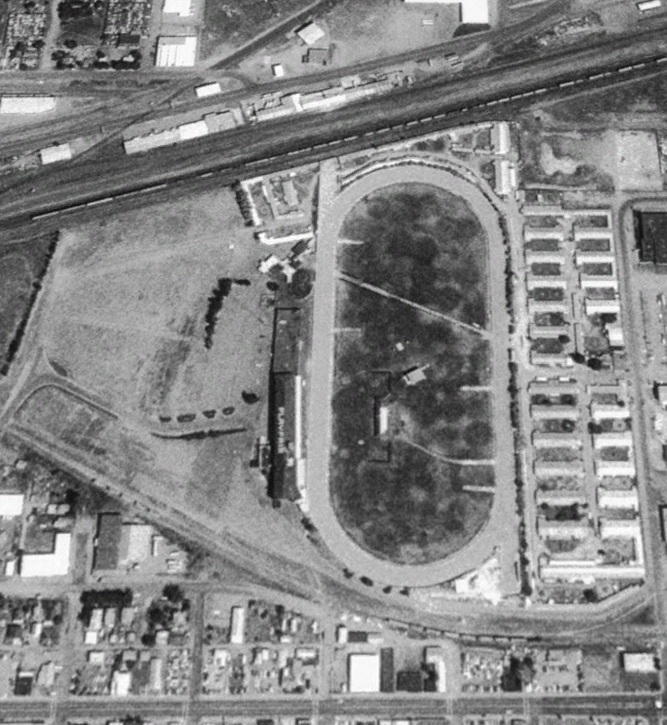
- Aerial view in 1995: parking lot, grandstand, track, and barns
- Interactive map of Playfair Race Course
- Location: N. Haven Street and E. Sprague Avenue; Spokane, Washington, U.S.
- Coordinates: 47.66°N 117.37°W
- Date opened: September 10, 1901; 124 years ago
- Date closed: July 2001, final races on December 17, 2000; 25 years ago
- Course type: Flat oval, five furlongs 1,100 yd (1.01 km)
- Notable races: Playfair Mile; Spokane Derby; Inland Empire Marathon

Location in the United States
Location in Washington

Playfair Race Course (known as the Spokane Interstate Fair from 1901–1935) was the home of horse racing in Spokane, Washington, from 1901 to 2000. The track started out as a four-furlong (half-mile) flat oval, and expanded to five furlongs (1,100 yards (1.01 km)) in 1946. The grandstand was on the west, with the home stretch heading south, and the stables were on the east side. The site's elevation is approximately 1,910 feet (580 m) above sea level.

The premier races run at the track were the Playfair Mile, Spokane Derby, and the two-mile (3.2 km) Inland Empire Marathon. The final races were on December 17, 2000, and the track officially closed the following July.

== Post-Closure ==
Located in the East Central section of the city between Sprague Avenue and the railroad, the facility assets were auctioned in March 2004, and it was demolished shortly after. The 63-acre (0.25 km^{2}) site was bought by City of Spokane in 2004 for $6.3 million, with the intent of partnering with Spokane County for a new sewage treatment facility. The deal soured and 48 acres (0.19 km^{2}) was sold in 2009 to SCAFCO, a steel-framing manufacturer.

Now owned by SCAFCO/The Stone Group and known as Playfair Commerce Park, the site comprises eleven industrial lots. Large metal silhouettes of race horses mark the entrance to the park.

== Ferris Field ==
Ferris Field, a wooden baseball park, was adjacent to the parking lot west of the track. Built in 1936, it was the home of the minor league Spokane Indians through 1956, and was named for city attorney George M. Ferris, a former player and manager for the Indians (at Natatorium Park) who secured funding from the Works Progress Administration (WPA) to build it. The baseball diamond was aligned east, toward the horse track, resulting in challenging sun conditions for the fielders in the late afternoon and early evening.

A fire in late October 1948 damaged most of the Ferris grandstands, and it was rebuilt in steel in the spring of 1949. It hosted high school football in 1948 and 1949, between the condemnation of wooden Gonzaga Stadium and the opening of Spokane Memorial Stadium in 1950 (renamed Joe Albi Stadium in 1962).

Spokane went without minor league baseball in 1957; the new Triple-A Spokane Indians of the Pacific Coast League arrived in 1958 (formerly the Los Angeles Angels) and moved about a mile (1½ km) east to the new Fairgrounds Park (now Avista Stadium) on Havana Street.

== Playfair Mile Winners ==
| Year | Horse | Jockey | Trainer |
|---|---|---|---|
| 2000 | Sunshine Scholar | Larry Munoz | Kim Wright |
| 1999 | not run | | |
| 1998 | not run | | |
| 1997 | Che Meza | Frank Best | Fred Davis |
| 1996 | not run | | |
| 1995 | Ought to Burn | Vince Graffagnini | Kenneth Cheff |
| 1994 | Native Rustler | Vince Ward | Richard Wright |
| 1993 | Amber Jett | Brett Pierce | Chuck Findlay |
| 1992 | Lincoln Logger | Mark Hadley | Gordon Platt |
| 1991 | Crab Salad | Larry Lacoursiere | Ken Whitted |
| 1990 | Chan's Dragon | Jerry Pruitt | Don Roberson |
| 1989 | Nakeen | Jose Corrales | Jack Steiner |
| 1988 | Native Act | Jerry Pruitt | Gary Olsen |
| 1987 | Chan's Dragon | Jerry Pruitt | Don Roberson |
| 1986 | Uncle Barrydown | Jerry Pruitt | |
| 1985 | Holme Run Kid | Terry Motsenbacher | |
| 1984 | Marlene's Boy | Doug Moore | Bill Stewart |
| 1983 | Eagle Joe | Akifumi Kato | |
| 1982 | Grey Barbarian | Todd Stephens | Allan Morris |
| 1981 | Idaho Tribe | Ray Youngren | |
| 1980 | Kam Tam Kan | Terry Motsenbacher | |
| 1979 | Charmhersweet | Akifumi Kato | |
| 1978 | Chief Yakima | Jerry Pruitt | |
| 1977 | Hyali Talk | Akifumi Kato | |
| 1976 | Cup Of Merc. | Mike James | |
| 1975 | Refusal | Wendell Matt | |
| 1974 | Mass Confusion | Wendell Matt | |
| 1973 | Ima Hitter | Akifumi Kato | |
| 1972 | Charity Line | Jerry Taketa | |
| 1971 | Fleet Ahead | J. Hathaway | |
| 1970 | Ruler's Whirl | R. Jensen | |
| 1969 1st Div. | Ruler's Whirl | F. Inda | |
| 1969 2nd Div. | Turbulator | D. Castle | |
| 1968 | Uncle Georger | Richard Wright | |
| 1967 | Uncle Georger | Richard Wright | |
| 1966 | Sixpenny Lane | Paul Frey | |
| 1965 | Late Bet | Fred Sheppard | |
| 1964 | Current Account | Joe Baze | |
| 1963 1st Div. | Smart Prince | Lenny Knowles | |
| 1963 2nd Div. | Tizza Doge | E. DeAlba | |
| 1962 | Cold Bay | J. Palmer | |
| 1961 | Aryess | Gilbert Simonis | |
| 1960 | Fleet Charge | Carl Schilling | |
| 1959 | | | |
| 1958 | Collaborator | | |
| 1948 | Lighted Way | | |
