= Yakima Meadows =

Former horse racing track in Yakima, Washington

Coordinates: 46°35′20″N 120°28′58″W

Yakima Meadows was a horse racing track located in Yakima, Washington.

The track closed in 1998 after 37 years of operation. It was a one-mile (1.6 km) dirt oval with seating for about 3,500 fans.
