= 2024–25 European windstorm season =

2024–2025 European windstorm season
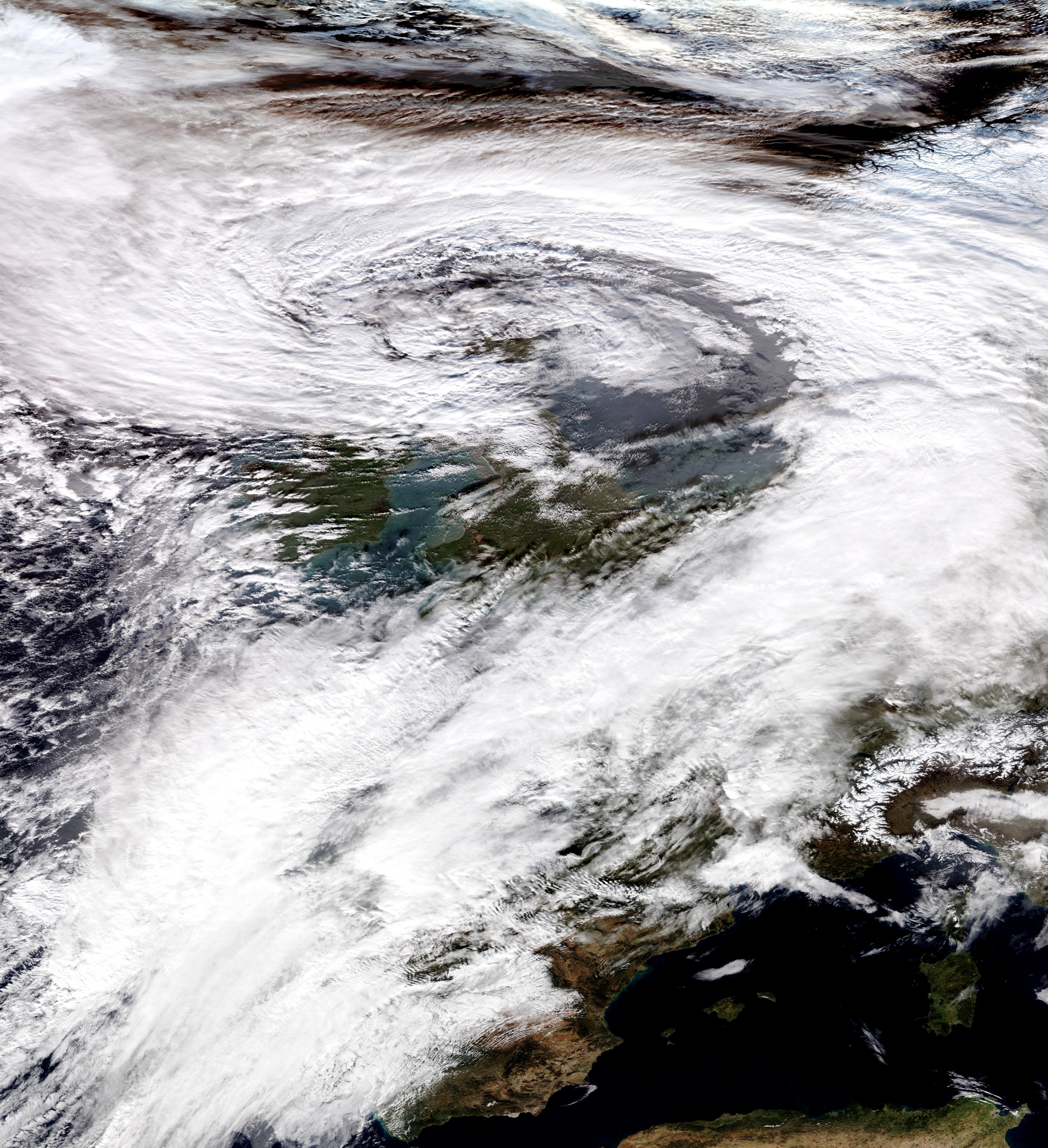
- Storm Éowyn, the strongest system of the season.
- First storm formed: 8 September 2024
- Last storm dissipated: 29 August 2025
- Strongest storm^{1}: Storm Éowyn 939 hPa (27.73 inHg)
- Strongest wind gust: Storm Éowyn 135 mph (217 km/h) at Cairnwell, Scotland
- Total storms: 41 (1)
- Total fatalities: 85
- ^{1}Strongest storm is determined by lowest pressure and maximum recorded non-mountainous wind gust is also included for reference.

The 2024–2025 European windstorm season was the tenth season. It comprises a year, from 1 September to 31 August, except shifted a month later in the Eastern Mediterranean Group. The storm names were announced four days before the start of the season on 28 August 2024. This was the sixth season in which the Netherlands participated (through KNMI) alongside the United Kingdom's Met Office and Ireland's Met Éireann in the western group. The Portuguese, Spanish, French and Belgian meteorological agencies collaborated for the eighth time, joined by Luxembourg's agency (Southwestern group). This is the fourth season of the Eastern Mediterranean and Central Mediterranean groups, in which they comprised respectively: Greece, Israel and Cyprus; and Italy, Slovenia, Croatia, Montenegro, North Macedonia and Malta.

== Background and naming ==
=== Definitions and naming conventions ===
There is no universal definition of what constitutes a windstorm in Europe, nor is there a universal system of naming storms.

In the Western Group, consisting of the UK, Ireland, and the Netherlands, a storm is named if one of those meteorological agencies issues an orange warning (known as amber in the UK per its National Severe Weather Warning Service system), which generally requires a likelihood of widespread sustained wind speeds greater than 65 km/h, or widespread wind gust speeds over 110 km/h. Required speeds vary slightly by agency and by season. Likelihood of on-land human impacts and inherent severity of the system further factors in whether to use the next pre-listed name.

The Southwest Group conducts its own naming (Spain, Portugal, and France).

For Greece to call upon the next name of its Group, the criteria are when forecast winds are above 50 km/h over land plus expected to impact infrastructure significantly. For Denmark to do so, a windstorm must have an hourly average windspeed of at least 90 km/h (25 m/s).

The Meteorology Department of the Free University of Berlin (FUB) names all high and low-pressure systems that affect Europe, though they do not assign names to any actual storms. A windstorm that is associated with one of these pressure systems is sometimes recognized by the name given to the associated pressure system by the FUB. Named windstorms that have been recognized by a European meteorological agency are described in this article.

Invoking the next listed name in Europe is commonly by a storm's forecast conditions in the next day or so – as public awareness and preparedness are often cited as the main purpose. A nascent storm very occasionally does not become or remain a storm when reaching the forecasting authority.

=== Western Group (United Kingdom, Ireland and the Netherlands) ===
In 2015, the Met Office and Met Éireann asked the public for name suggestions; its first "Name our Storms" promotion. The offices produced the publicly nominated list for 2015–2018, common to both the UK and Ireland, with the Netherlands taking part from 2019 onwards.

These names were chosen for the 2024–2025 season in the UK, Ireland and Netherlands. For a windstorm to be named, the United Kingdom's Met Office, Ireland's Met Éireann, or the Netherlands' Royal Netherlands Meteorological Institute (KNMI) have to issue an amber weather warning, most often for wind, but a storm can also be named for amber warnings of rain and snow (e.g. Storm Arwen in 2021).

- Ashley
- Bert
- Conall
- Darragh
- Éowyn
- Floris
- Gerben (unused)
- Hugo (unused)
- Izzy (unused)
- James (unused)
- Kayleigh (unused)
- Lewis (unused)
- Mavis (unused)
- Naoise (unused)
- Otje (unused)
- Poppy (unused)
- Rafi (unused)
- Sayuri (unused)
- Tilly (unused)
- Vivienne (unused)
- Wren (unused)

=== South-Western Group (France, Spain, Portugal, Belgium and Luxembourg) ===
This was the eighth year of the meteorological agencies of France, Spain and Portugal making a naming list of storms for their group.

- Aitor
- Berenice
- Caetano
- Dorothea
- Enol
- Floriane
- Garoe
- Herminia
- Ivo
- Jana
- Konrad
- Laurence
- Martinho
- Nuria
- Olivier
- Pauline (unused)
- Rudiger (unused)
- Salma (unused)
- Timothee (unused)
- Vanda (unused)
- Wolfgang (unused)

=== Central Mediterranean Group (Italy, Slovenia, Croatia, Bosnia & Herzegovina, Montenegro, North Macedonia and Malta) ===
The following names are chosen for the 2024–25 season in Italy, Slovenia, Croatia, Bosnia & Herzegovina, Montenegro, North Macedonia and Malta on 1 September 2024.

- Atena
- Boris
- Cassandra
- Dionisio
- Elena
- Felix
- Gabri
- Hans
- Ines
- Lukas
- Moira (unused)
- Nenu (unused)
- Oana (unused)
- Pino (unused)
- Rosa (unused)
- Sirio (unused)
- Talia (unused)
- Uli (unused)
- Vera (unused)
- Zoran (unused)

=== Eastern Mediterranean Group (Greece, Israel and Cyprus) ===
The Eastern Mediterranean Group works slightly differently compared to other naming lists, instead of ending a season on 31 August of that year, they end the season on 30 September of that year. These are the names that were chosen for the 2024–25 season in Greece, Israel and Cyprus:

- Alexandros
- Bora
- Coral
- Daphne (unused)
- Ermis (unused)
- Frida (unused)
- Gerasimos (unused)
- Hemera (unused)
- Ido (unused)
- Julia (unused)
- Kiniras (unused)
- Lea (unused)
- Marinos (unused)
- Nestor (unused)
- Ofek (unused)
- Pelagia (unused)
- Qesem (unused)
- Roni (unused)
- Solon (unused)
- Tria (unused)
- Uri (unused)
- Valeria (unused)
- Yam (unused)
- Zoe (unused)

=== Northern Group (Denmark, Norway and Sweden) ===
This naming group, like the naming from the Free University of Berlin, does not use a naming list but names storms when it has not received a name by any other meteorological service in Europe and is projected to affect Denmark, Norway or Sweden.

- Jakob
- Sif

=== Central/FUB naming Group (Germany, Switzerland, Austria, Poland, Czech Republic, Slovakia and Hungary) ===
Like the Northern Group, the Free University of Berlin names storms based on low pressures across the continent and does not use a naming list. The storms listed below were strong enough or were anticipated to cause equal or more disruption than if it were named by one of the other groups.

- Quiteria
- Bianca
- Ginette
- Darius
- Augustin

=== Atlantic ex-tropical cyclones ===
Ex-tropical cyclones (subtropical storms, tropical storms, or hurricanes) that directly impacted a European country from the 2024 Atlantic Hurricane Season or 2025 Atlantic hurricane Season which became a European windstorm and retained its name as assigned by the National Hurricane Center (NHC) in Miami, Florida.

- Kirk

== Season summary ==
Western group
South-western group
Northern group
FUB naming group
Central Mediterranean group
North-eastern group
South-eastern group
Eastern Mediterranean group

All storms named by European meteorological organisations in their respective forecasting areas, as well as Atlantic hurricanes that transitioned into European windstorms and retained the name assigned by the National Hurricane Center:

== Storms ==
=== Storm Atena ===
Storm Atena
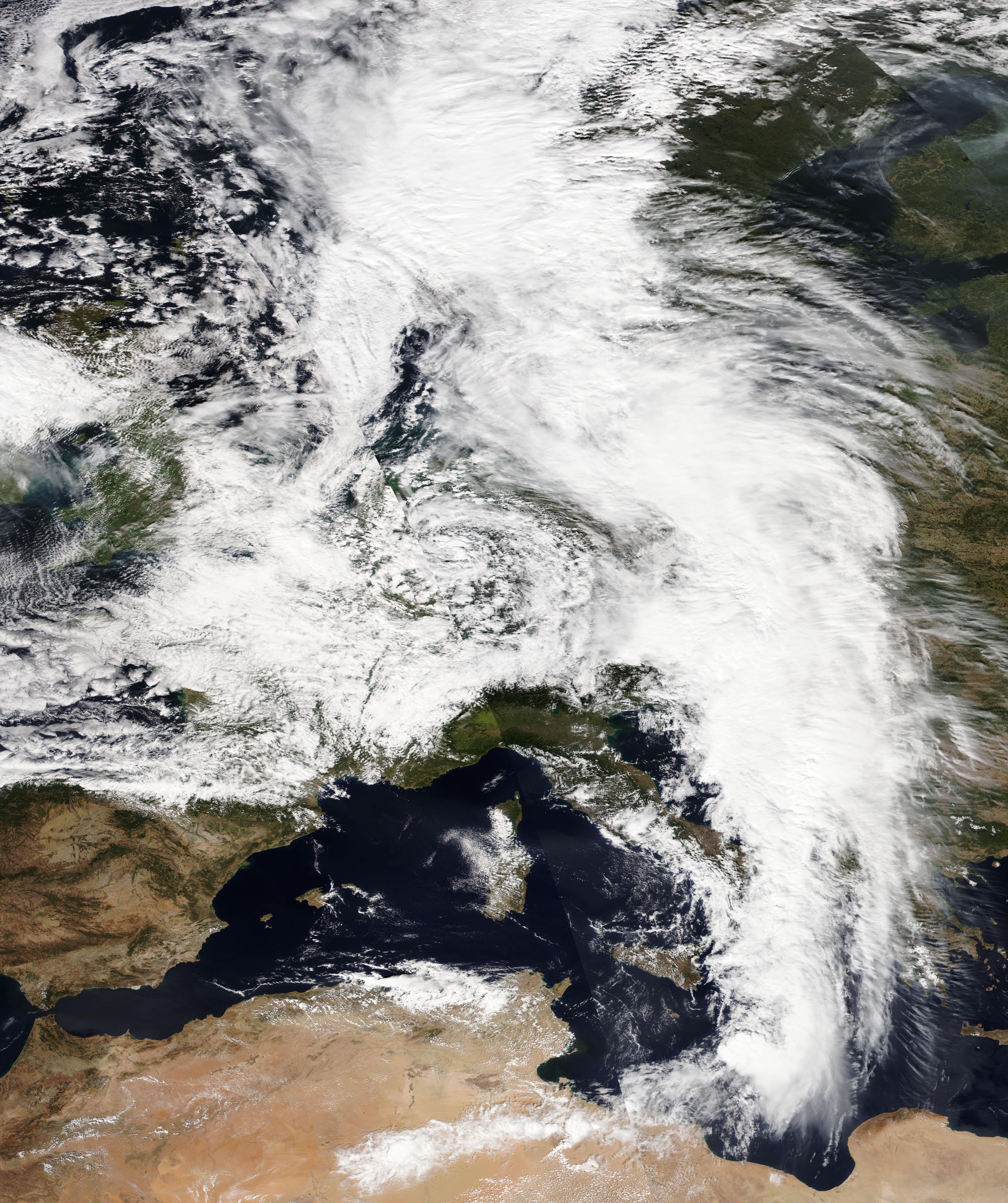

- Area affected: Italy, Greece, Croatia
- Date of impact: 8–11 September 2024
- Maximum wind gust: Unspecified
- Lowest pressure: 1,000 hPa (29.53 inHg)
- Fatalities: 4
- Power outages: Unspecified

Storm Atena was named on 8 September 2024, by the Italian Servizio Meteorologico.

The storm system tracked across the Mediterranean, bringing heavy rainfall to Italy, where an orange rain and thunderstorm warning was issued for Apulia, prompting the naming of the system.

Then in Croatia a red rain and thunderstorm warning was issued for the Dubrovnik region.

Storm Atena was expected to bring heavy rain, storms, strong winds, and hail to Greece from the night of 9 September to the afternoon of 11 September. It affected most of the country: the western, centre-east, and northern parts of the mainland, as well as the northern and eastern Aegean islands.

In Pieria the storm produced a spell of rain overnight 7 to 8 September with a prolonged thunderstorm hitting the Mount Olympus area during the evening of 8 September.

Storm Atena caused major traffic problems on the island of Rhodes after hitting on 11 September. The city centre, the Rhodes-Lindos road and the Analipsis area experienced severe flooding and heavy traffic. On 10 September, the storm also led to traffic accidents and power outages that disabled traffic lights. In addition, some people were trapped in elevators and required assistance from the fire department.

=== Storm Boris (Anett) ===
Storm Boris
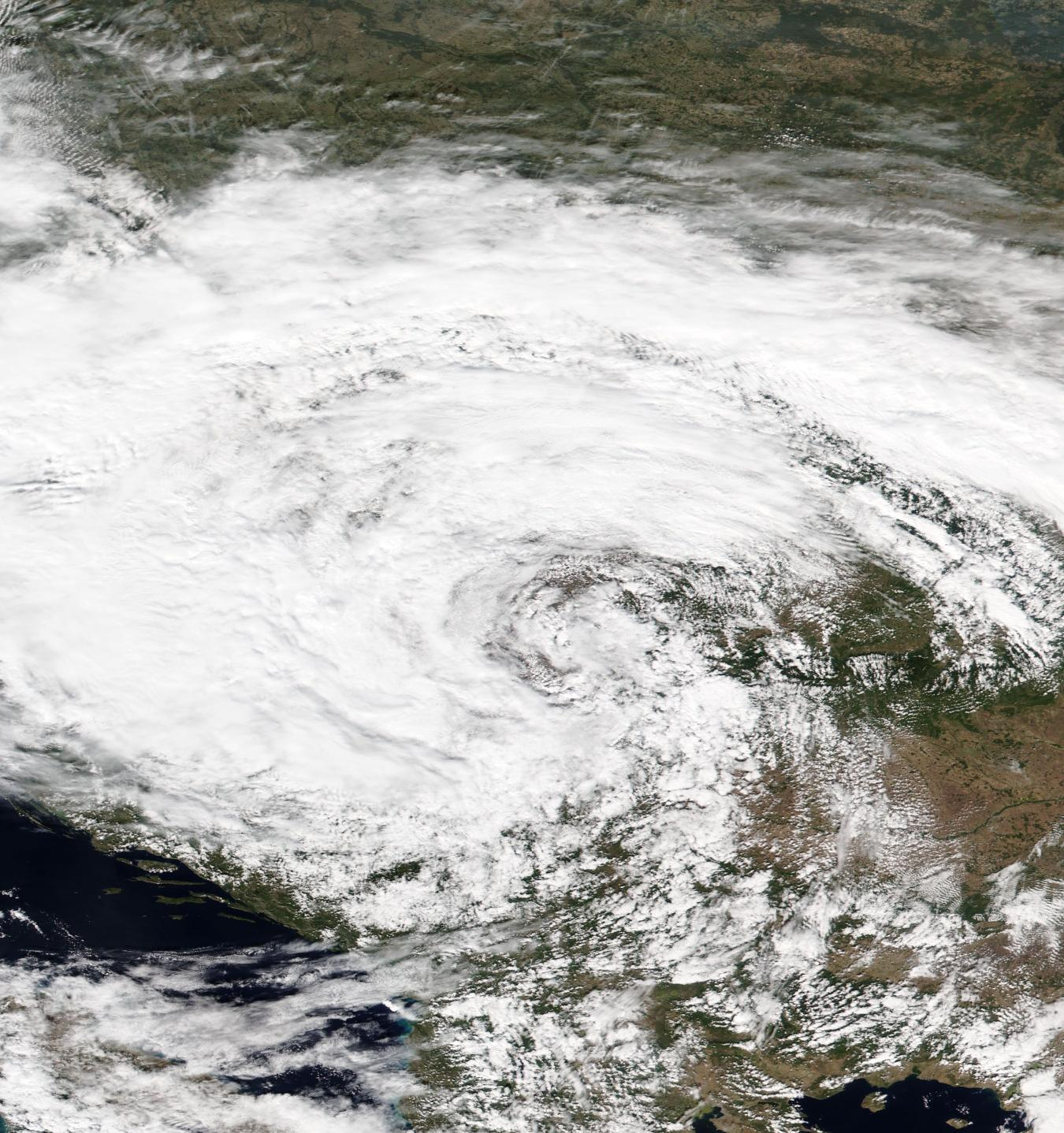

- Area affected: Austria, Czech Republic, Poland, The Balkans, Slovakia, Romania
- Date of impact: 11–19 September 2024
- Maximum wind gust: Unspecified
- Lowest pressure: 998 hPa (29.47 inHg)
- Fatalities: 26
- Power outages: 260,000

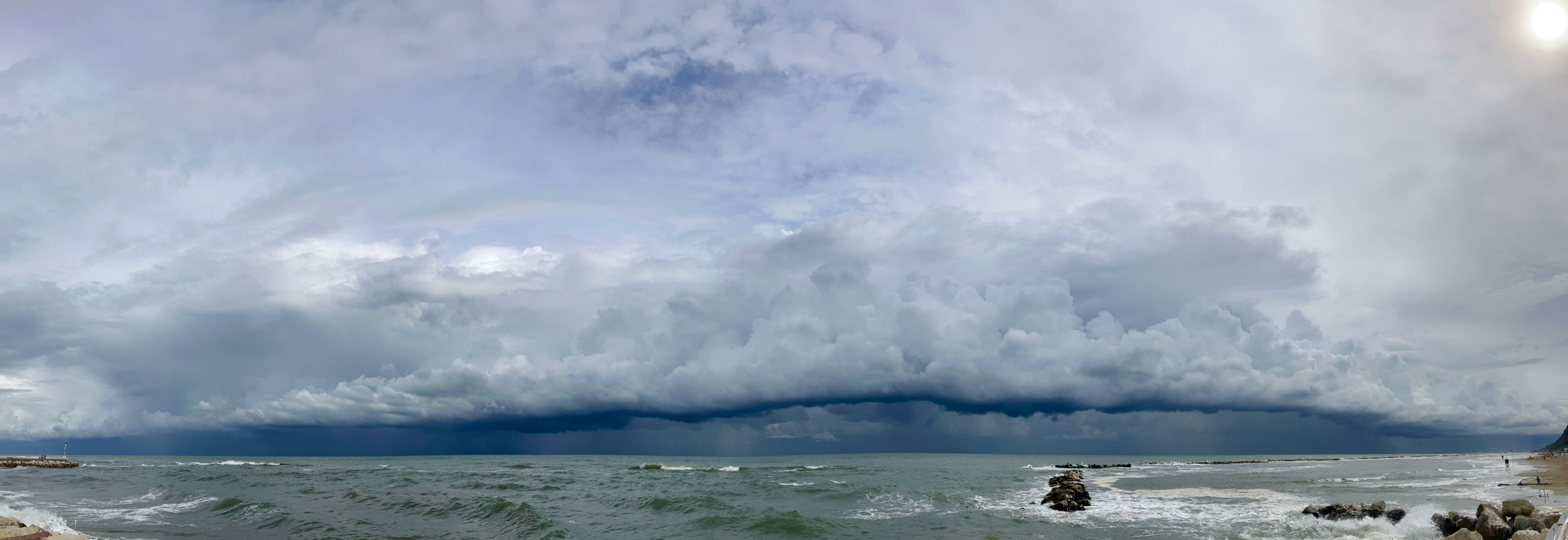
Storm Boris seen from Italy across the Adriatic Sea

Storm Boris was named on 11 September 2024, by the Italian Servizio Meteorologico. It was also named Anett on the same day by Free University of Berlin.

The storm system caused disruption with heavy rainfall and gusty winds, soon after Storm Atena, which came through a few days prior. As a result, many weather warnings were put in place.

In Italy, yellow wind and rain warnings concentrated around the north of the country, and a down the east coast. Orange wind warnings encompassing were raised in the metropolitan areas of Rome, Florence, Bologna and Venice where disruption is expected. The entirety of Croatia is under an orange wind and rain warning as well as most of Slovenia. Parts of Bosnia and Herzegovina also have yellow wind and thunderstorm warnings.

On 14 September 2024, red alerts, indicating "intense meteorological phenomena", were issued in Austria, the Czech Republic, Germany, Poland and 19 people were killed as a result of the floods. Six people drowned in Romania, five in Poland, four in the Czech Republic, and one in Italy. A firefighter was killed in Austria, and two men in Lower Austria drowned in their homes. Multiple people are currently missing in Romania and the Czech Republic. Hundreds were stranded by floods in Romania. Mandatory evacuations were ordered in several areas of the Czech Republic. The town of Głuchołazy in Poland was evacuated along with 1600 people from Kłodzko County. Over 260,000 households were affected by power outages in the Czech Republic. A hiker died from hypothermia in a snowstorm in the Italian Alps on 13 September.

On 17 September 2024, a firefighter died in Foggia when his service car was swept away by a raging torrent on state road 90 connecting San Severo to Apricena. On 17 September 2024, a two-seater plane with three French people on board crashed into the Tuscan-Emilian Apennines due to the weather; two days later the three bodies and their plane wreckage were found. On 18 September 2024, the Emilia Romagna began red alert for heavy rains. The Tuscany region peaked at orange alert. On 19 September, serious damage afflicted Emilia-Romagna with many watercourses overflowing and two missing people in Bagnacavallo, with over 1,000 people evacuated.

On 26 September, the number of fatalities in Poland rose to 9.

Munich Re estimates the total damage to have been ~4.2 billion euros ($4.3 billion) of which ~1.9 billion euros ($2.1 billion) were insured.

=== Storm Aitor (Constanze) ===
Storm Aitor
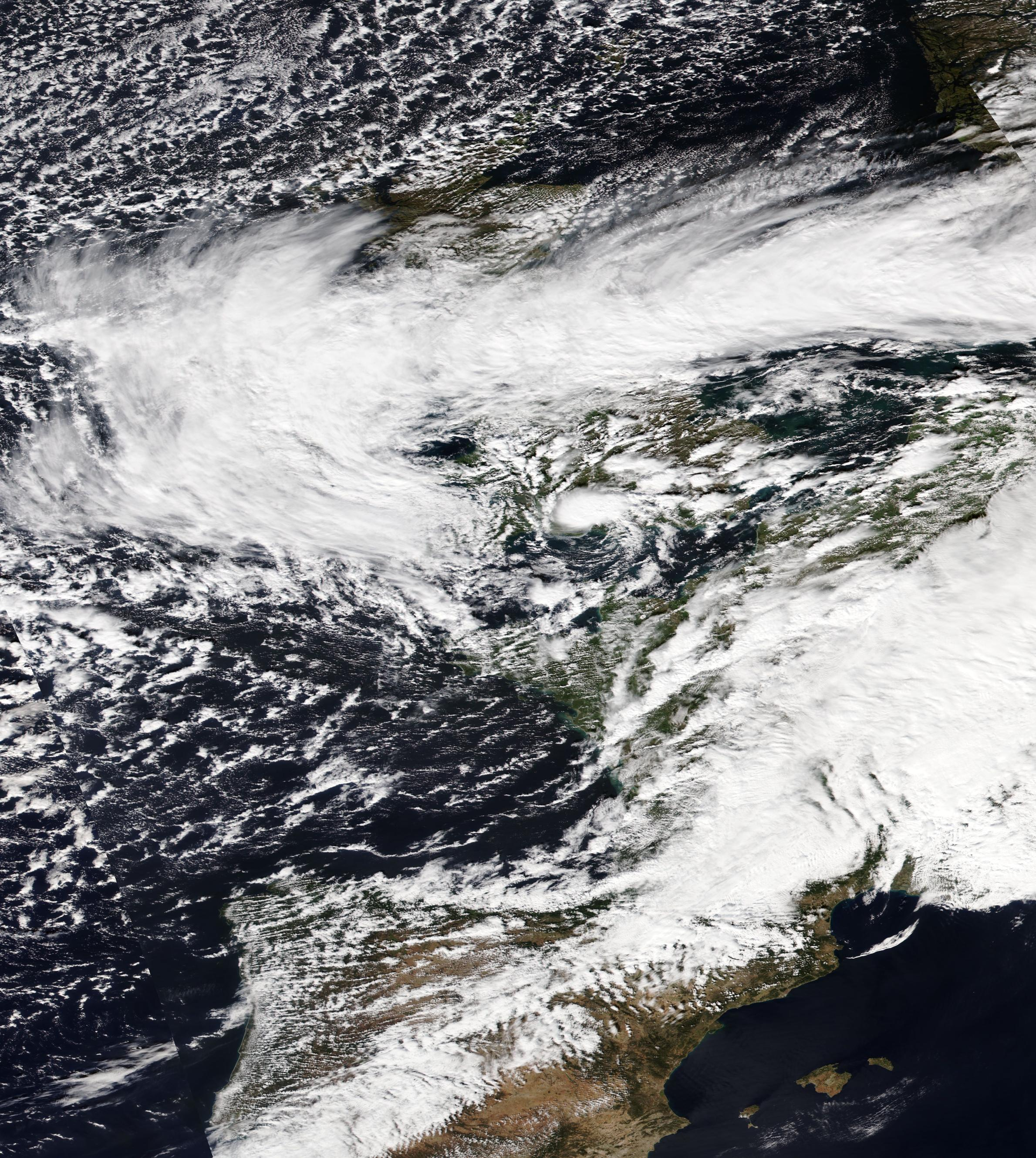

- Area affected: British Isles, France, Spain, Portugal
- Date of impact: 23 – 28 September 2024
- Maximum wind gust: 92 mph (148 km/h) at Camaleño, Spain
- Lowest pressure: 984 hPa (29.06 inHg)
- Fatalities: Unspecified
- Power outages: None

On 23 September, FU Berlin named an area of low pressure over the Atlantic Ocean: Constanze, before it was named Aitor by AEMET, as it was expected to produce heavy rain over Spain.

Many areas of central, eastern and south-western France were under a yellow rain and wind warning with a small orange rain warnings for a few regions in the east of the country. In Spain yellow wind and rain warnings were in force for the far north-west of the country along the Atlantic coast, with an orange rain warning in similar areas where 80 millimetres (3.1 in) of rainfall could occur in 12 hours. In Portugal orange and Yellow rain warnings were issued by IMPA.

The UKMO and Met Éireann issued yellow and amber rain warnings for parts of the British Isles.

In Spain, strong winds have uprooted trees, causing them to fall across the ground. Meanwhile, intense rainfall in Vigo and other parts of Galicia has turned streets into rivers, making it difficult for cars to navigate. Additionally, in Rias Baixas, a hailstorm has caused significant damage to a field. Even in Vitoria, high winds have blown over large rubbish containers.

In the United Kingdom, emergency services have had to rescue many stranded people and clear flooded roads and railways. The M5 motorway near Bristol and the A421 have been severely damaged due to the heavy persistent rainfall, and rail services between Wolverhampton and Shrewsbury have been disrupted. Residents in several areas, including Bedfordshire, Oxfordshire, and Shropshire, have been evacuated due to flooding. Also, Dozens of people have been rescued by firefighters from rising floodwaters in Northamptonshire. Thirty-five people had to be helped to safety from a caravan park in Yarwell, near Oundle at 19:30 on 26 September, following an evacuation order.

=== Storm Cassandra (Finny) ===
Storm Cassandra
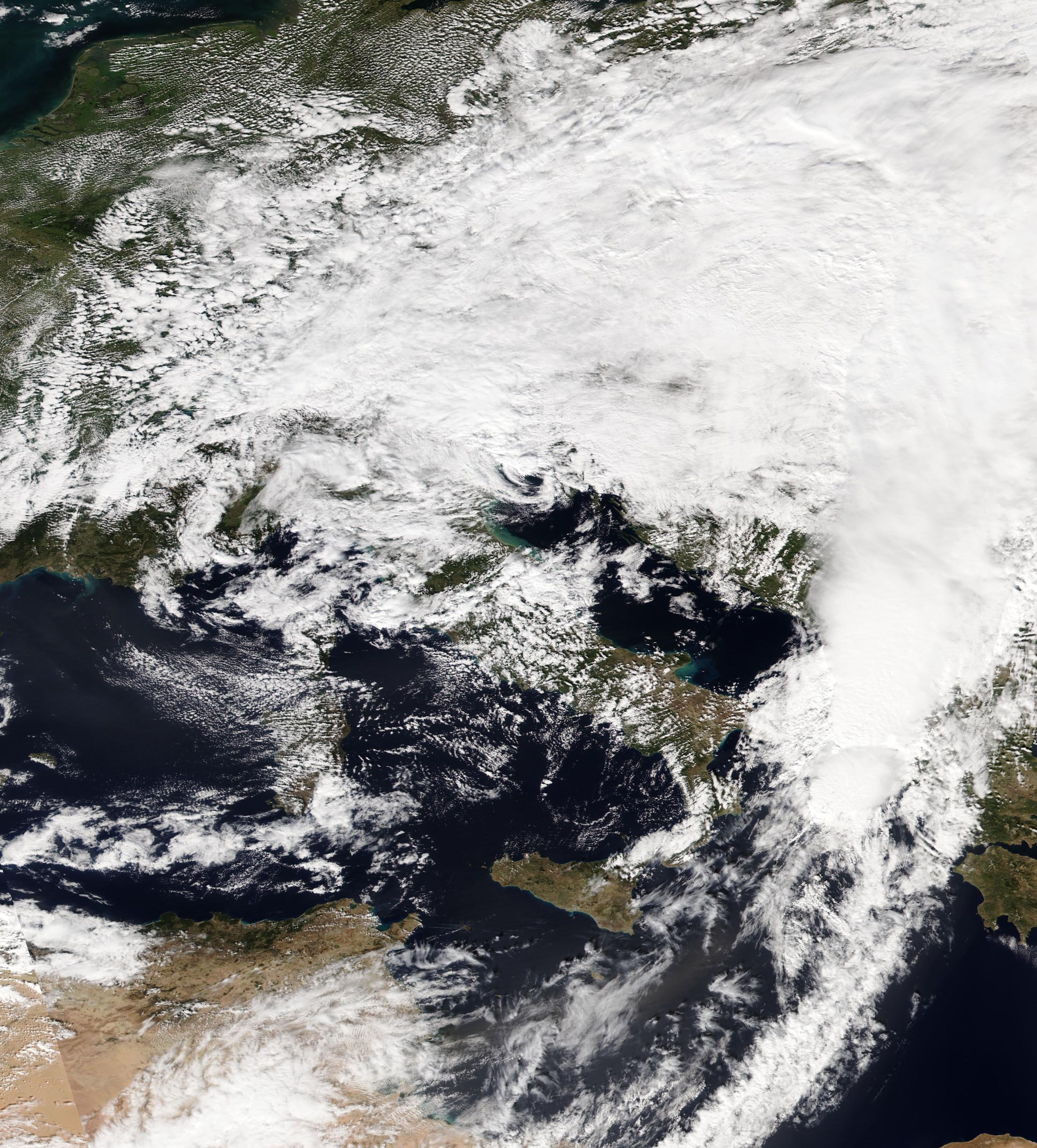

- Area affected: Italy, The Balkans, Corsica, Hungary, Austria, Greece
- Date of impact: 2–6 October 2024
- Maximum wind gust: Unspecified
- Lowest pressure: 997 hPa (29.44 inHg)
- Fatalities: 27
- Power outages: Unspecified

Storm Cassandra was named on 2 October 2024, by Montenegro Institute of Hydrometeorology and Seismology, and Finny by Free University of Berlin.

Meteo France issued an orange rain and flood warning in southern Corsica, whilst a yellow of the same warning was in force for northern Corsica. Throughout the Balkans, there were numerous rain and wind warnings in force, including orange rain warnings in Slovenia and Croatia.

In Croatia, a red rain warning was issued on 3 October, for antipated impacts from severe flooding. This warning includes the regions of Knin, Split, Gospić, Rijeka, Kvarner and Kvarnerić as well as the west coast of Istria. A red and orange wind warning was also in force for some of the areas mentioned above, as well as southern regions such as, Northern Dalmatia, Central Dalmatia and South Dalmatia where winds up to 65–130 kilometres per hour (40–81 mph) was expected.

Torrential rain on the evening and night of 3–4 October caused floods and landslides in southern Bosnia and Herzegovina, 27 people died, burying houses and blocking off roads and railways.

=== Ex-Hurricane Kirk ===
Ex-Hurricane Kirk
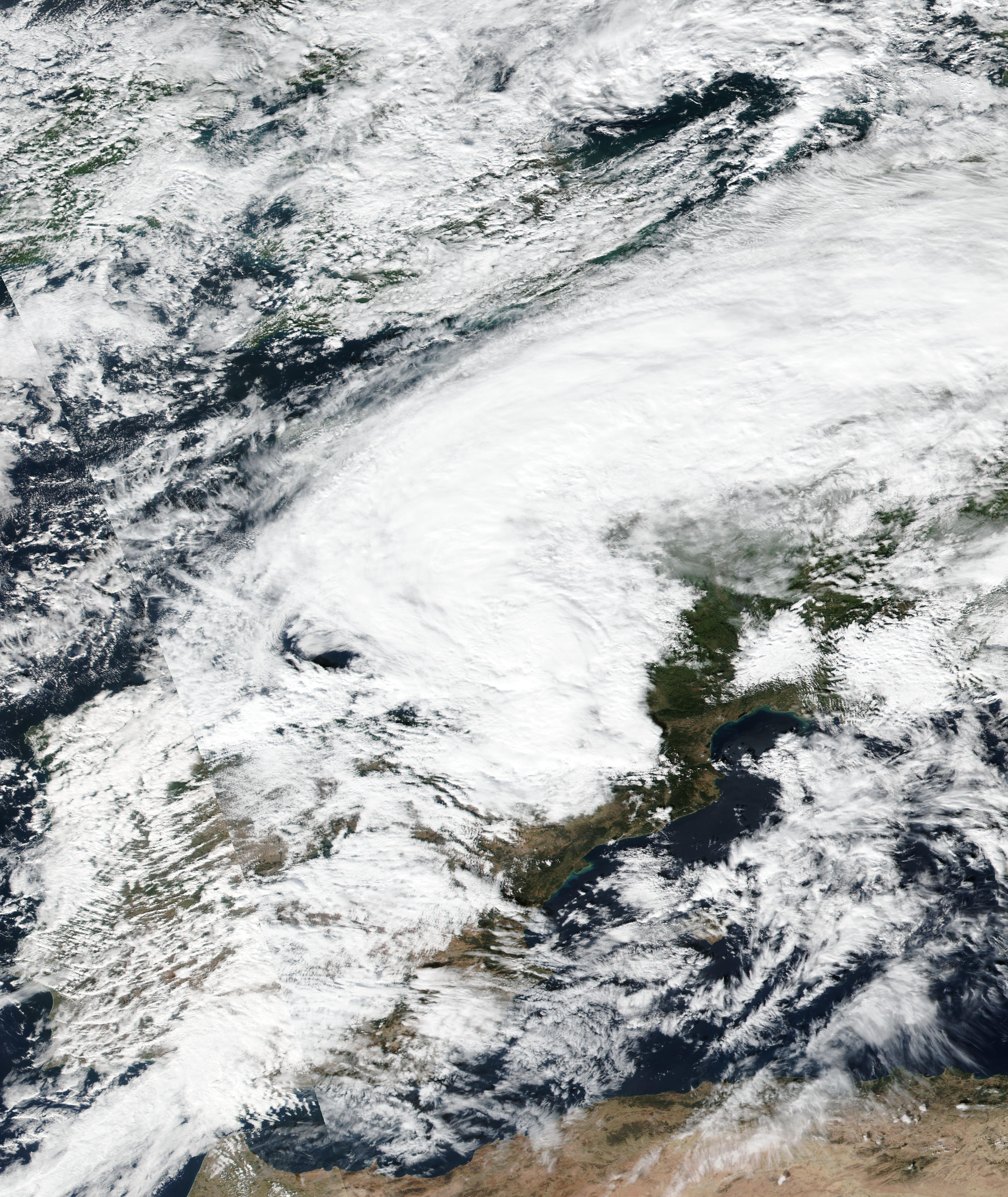

- Area affected: France, Spain, Portugal, Germany, Luxembourg, Belgium, Switzerland, Sweden, Norway
- Date of impact: 8–11 October 2024
- Maximum wind gust: 95 mph (153 km/h) (most likely)
- Lowest pressure: 977 hPa (28.85 inHg)
- Fatalities: 1
- Power outages: 400,000+

Ex-Hurricane Kirk initially developed on 29 September 2024, off the Cabo Verde islands and was named the next day by the National Hurricane Center. Kirk affected Europe from 8 October, a day after becoming an extratropical cyclone. After reaching its peak intensity on 4 October, with Category 4 winds of 145 mph (233 km/h), far to the east-northeast of the northern Leeward Islands, Kirk became an extratropical cyclone on October 7, then passed north of the Azores, before moving over western Europe on October 8.

France enforced a yellow rain warning for much of the country except for the far south-east of the country and regions on the English Channel. An orange rain warning with an accompanying yellow wind warning was issued for parts of the north-west, including Paris, as well as for the Pyrenees on the Spanish border. A red warning was later added for Seine-et-Marne for flooding. In Spain warnings were issued for widespread strong winds, with gusts potentially reaching hurricane force in parts of northern Spain, heavy rain, especially in Galicia and the western part of the Iberian Peninsula, and significant wave heights along the Atlantic coast. A red wind warning was issued for Picos de Europa where winds up to 86 mph (138 km/h) where expected. In Portugal an orange coastal event warning was enforced due to the anticipated large wave heights of 5–6 metres, with a yellow wind warning where, southwest winds with gusts of up to 75 km/h, reaching up to 100 km/h in mountainous areas.

Orange rain warnings were issued for all of Luxembourg in response to Kirk. Germany also issued orange rain warnings for many central areas, as well as a red rain warning encompassing many south-western areas. An orange wind warnings has also been issued for southern regions. Switzerland has also issued yellow wind warnings for central and eastern parts of the country. In Sweden a yellow wind warning was in force for Stockholm and the surrounding areas. Meanwhile, further north an orange flood warning was issued for coastal areas of Västernorrland and Västerbotten county.

In Porto, Portugal's main northern city, the storm hit hardest, uprooting 400 trees. Cars were damaged, and rail services were interrupted near Barcelos, also in the north. The storm cut power to more than 300,000 households, according to the country's electricity supplier. Weather and civil protection officials, who had predicted winds of up to 75 mph (121 km/h) and heavy rain, placed the coast on a yellow alert as waves reached up to seven metres (23 ft) high. Strong winds from Kirk severely impacted Portugal's apple production, with over 65% of the crops suffering damage. Losses from this are estimated to be in the "tens of millions of euros." Spanish weather officials issued an orange alert for the north and northwest of the country, warning of winds up to 87 mph (140 km/h) in the Asturias region. In Galicia, the northwest reported roads blocked by mudslides and fallen trees in urban areas. Portugal's civil protection authority reported over 1,300 incidents from Tuesday night to Wednesday, with three-quarters involving fallen trees in the north. Spain also experienced heavy winds and rainfall, with waves as high as seven metres crashing ashore, according to local media. Storm Kirk primarily wreaked havoc in the northern half of Spain. Strong gusts caused delays and cancellations in rail and air services, park closures, collapsed roofs, and damage from fallen trees.

Meanwhile, in southern France, a storm swell in the Mediterranean near the port city of Sète overturned three boats, killing one amateur sailor and leaving another in critical condition, according to Herault department authorities. Additionally, 64,000 people in the south of France were left without power, as reported by Enedis to AFP, while several departments saw roads cut off by floodwaters. The worst-hit area, Pyrenees-Atlantiques, saw 35,000 households lose electricity, with other southwestern and central eastern departments also affected.

=== Storm Berenice ===
Storm Berenice
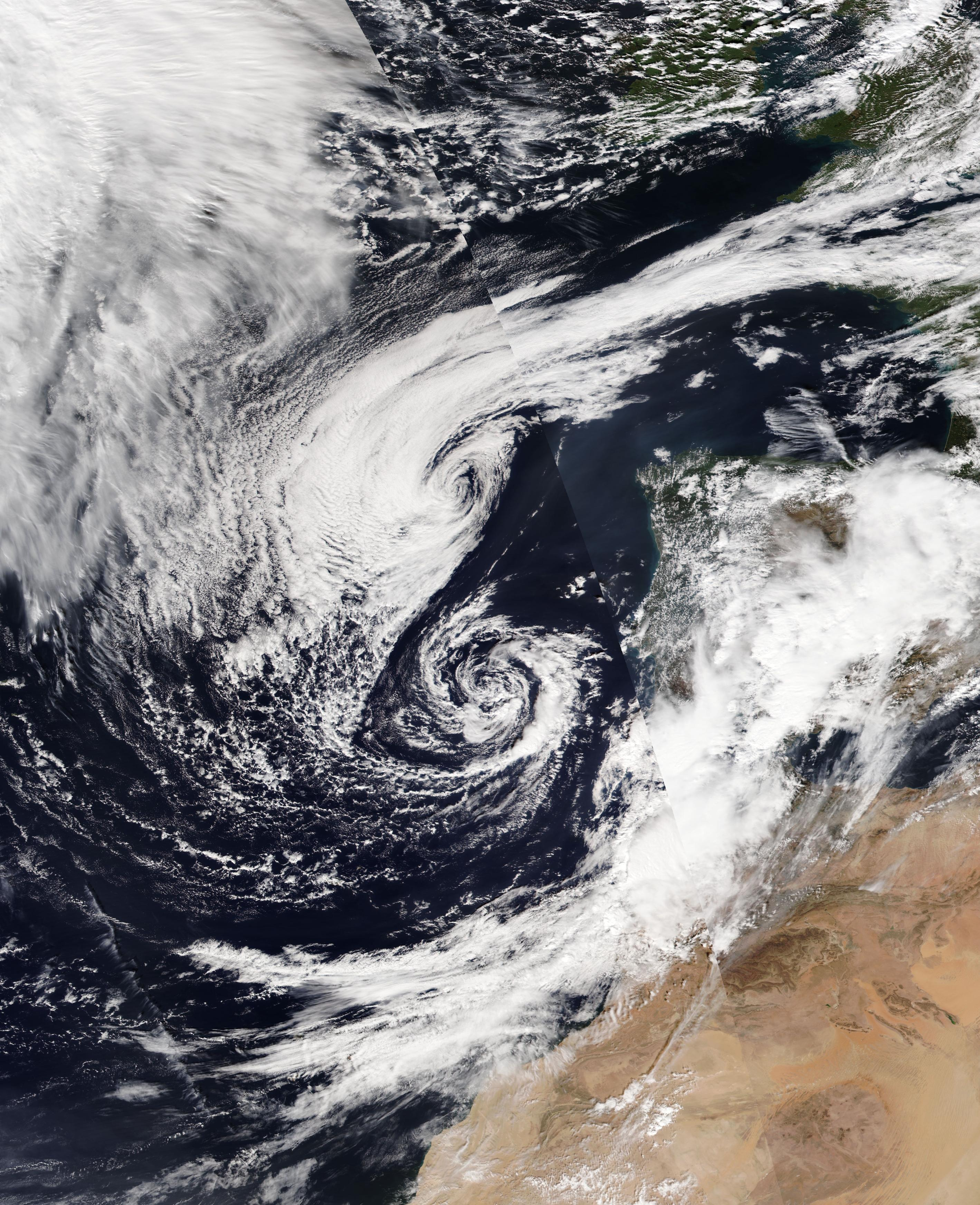

- Area affected: Spain, Portugal, Morocco
- Date of impact: 11–13 October 2024
- Maximum wind gust: 80 mph (130 km/h) at Picos De Europa, Asturias, Spain
- Lowest pressure: 992 hPa (29.29 inHg)
- Fatalities: 0
- Power outages: None

Storm Berenice was named on 11 October 2024, by the Spanish AEMET.

Yellow rain warnings were in force for parts of Portugal as well as western parts Spain. Also in Spain, there were orange rain warnings in force for south-western parts around Seville where 12-hour accumulated precipitation was expected to reach 100 millimetres (3.9 in) in places. Meanwhile, further north, an extreme red rain warning was in force surrounding Sierra Norte de Sevilla and Sierra y Pedroches, where 12-hour accumulated precipitation was expected to reach 120 millimetres (4.7 in). In Morocco, orange heavy rain warnings where issued, as well as a yellow warning down coastal parts.

In Spain, parts of the A-7 motorway between Cancelada in Estepona and San Pedro Alcántara in Marbella were flooded due to torrential rainfall early on 14 October. At the Guadalmansa dam, a monitoring network recorded 27 millimetres (1.1 in) of rainfall in the span of one hour that day. The La Concepción reservoir recorded nearly 14 millimetres (0.55 in) of rainfall in that same period of time.

=== Storm Ashley (Josefine) ===
Storm Ashley
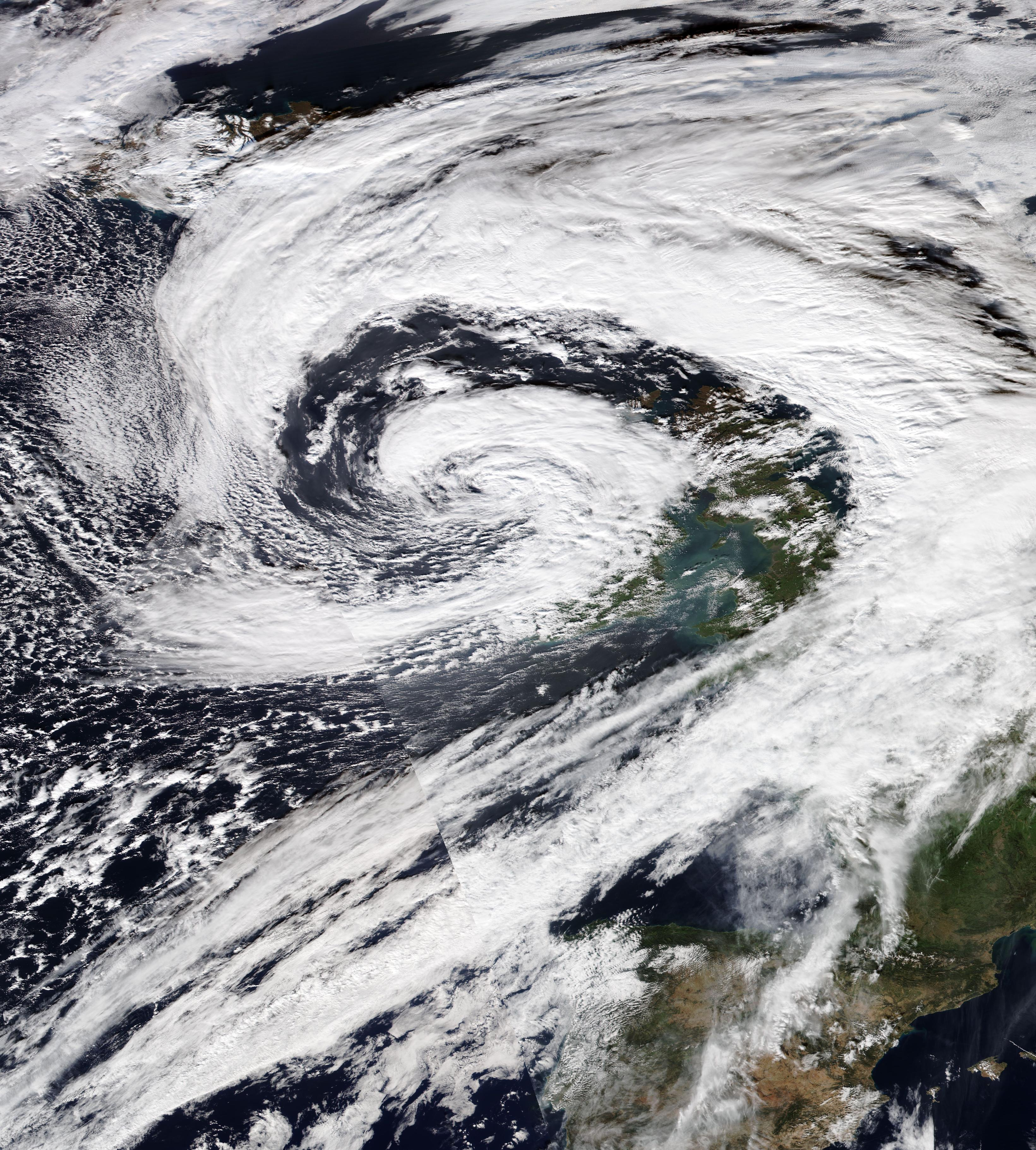

- Area affected: United Kingdom, Ireland, Norway
- Date of impact: 18–21 October 2024
- Maximum wind gust: 121 mph (195 km/h): Cairngorm, United Kingdom
- Lowest pressure: 959 hPa (28.32 inHg)
- Fatalities: Unspecified
- Power outages: Unspecified

Storm Ashley was named on 18 October 2024, by the Irish Met Éireann and Josefine by Free University of Berlin.

Storm Ashley was forecast to first impact Ireland, thus being named by Met Éireann. The Met Office issued an amber warning in western Scotland due to the threat of strong winds on Sunday afternoon and evening.

In Ireland, Storm Ashley is expected to bring strong and gusty southerly winds western Ireland, combined with high spring tides where an orange wind warning was issued place. This hazardous weather event could lead to several impacts including, coastal flooding, large coastal waves, and displaced objects are possible due to the powerful winds and rising sea levels. Fallen trees could block roads and damage property. The severe weather could make driving hazardous and conditions at sea will be extremely dangerous. Widespread power outages may occur due to damage to power lines. Additionally, buildings that have already been weakened may be further damaged by the strong winds. A wider yellow wind warning was issued for the rest of Ireland for the impacts.

After impacting the British Isles a day previously, Ashley impacted western Norway where an orange wind warning was in force for parts of the Sognefjorden to Sunnmøre regions on the west coast, with a broad yellow warning encompassing it.

As the storm passed over the Scottish Highlands on Sunday night, average wind speeds hit 137 kilometres per hour (85 mph) with gusts of at least 179 kilometres per hour (111 mph) provisionally recorded at the summit of Cairn Gorm. Speed restrictions are in place on rail lines across Scotland due to the high winds, while flights continued to be impacted at Aberdeen Airport this morning. At least four have been cancelled, including one bound for London Heathrow Airport. In England, National Rail said Northern services between Bolton and Blackburn were being blocked by a tree on the line this morning. The Environment Agency had 45 flood warnings, where flooding is expected, in place across England on Monday, including along the south Cornwall coast and large parts of the River Severn, after the river burst its banks, submerging the town of Worcester, the previous day. An injured passenger was airlifted from a ferry between Aberdeen and Orkney on Sunday evening after falling on board in rough conditions. Earlier, police said a man, woman and young boy were taken to hospital after experiencing difficulty in the sea at Aberdeen Beach.

A top windspeed of 121 mph (195 km/h) was recorded at the Cairngorm Summit, Inverness-shire, Scotland, United Kingdom.

=== Storm Jakob (Martina) ===
Storm Jakob
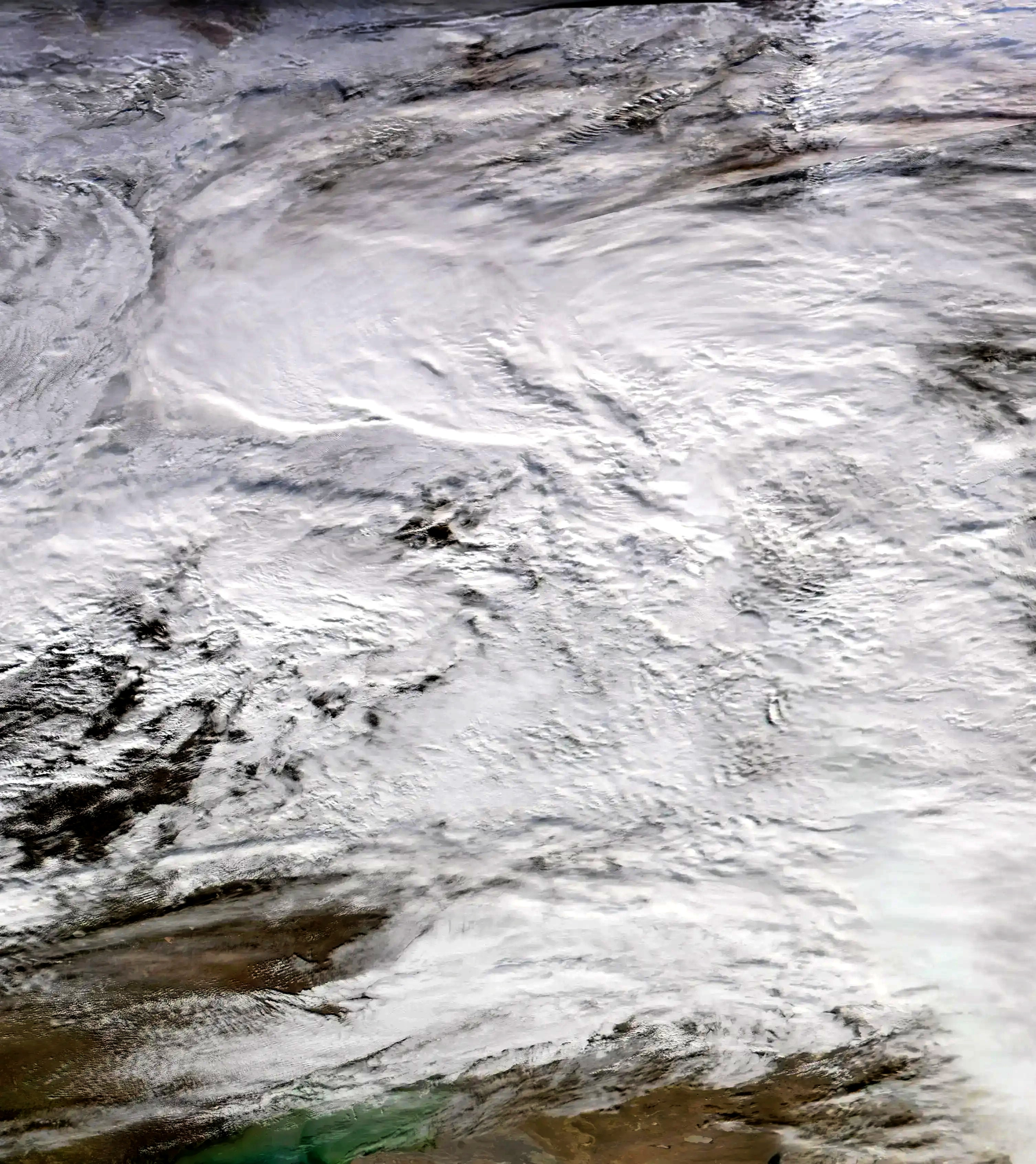
- Area affected: Norway, Sweden, Finland, Estonia, Latvia, Lithuania
- Date of impact: 31 October – 2 November 2024
- Maximum wind gust: Unspecified
- Lowest pressure: 970 hPa (28.64 inHg)
- Fatalities: Unspecified
- Power outages: Unspecified

Storm Jakob was named on 31 October 2024, by the Norwegian Meteorological Institute; it was also named Martina by the Free University of Berlin.

In preparation for Jakob, train services between Oslo and Bergen in Norway were cancelled on 31 October due to the possibility of flooding and landslides.

A red warning has been sent out about extremely heavy rain in parts of Western Norway on Thursday 31 October. A rain warning has also been issued at orange and yellow levels for adjacent areas. In Sweden, yellow wind warnings were in force for the coast on the Skagerrak and Kattegat for disruption from wind. In the Baltics exist the similar warnings. Lithuania, had a yellow wind warning in force for western areas. All of Latvia under a yellow wind warning, including Riga and the Gulf of Riga. Estonia issued yellow wind warnings for the coast and south-eastern parts of the country.

Here are the maximum rainfall amounts seen in Norway through 31 October:

Gullfjellet saw the highest rainfall with 195.1 mm, followed by Opstveit with 159.9 mm, Fossmark with 154.6 mm, Haukedal with 150.5 mm, Folgefonna Skisenter with 134.9 mm, Djønno with 119.8 mm, Eikelandsosen with 115.1 mm, Sædalen with 114.9 mm, Myrkdalen-Vetlebotn with 113.8 mm, and Ullensvang Forsøksgard with 113.7 mm.

Due to the severe weather, multiple train departures have been cancelled, and several county roads have been closed, according to national broadcaster NRK. A road east of Bergen was closed after a rockslide, though no other storm-related damage has been reported. In Sweden, strong winds brought by Storm Jakob left more than 12,000 people without power on Friday, and have led to train, bus and ferry services being cancelled. Due to severe weather conditions, several train routes in Sweden have been disrupted. The Swedish Transport Administration has been forced to suspend services on specific sections of the railway network to ensure passenger safety. Train services between Uddevalla and Strömstad have been halted. Trains running between Nässjö and Vetlanda, Linköping and Kalmar, and Linköping and Västervik have been affected. The primary reason for these disruptions is the risk of falling trees onto the railway tracks caused by strong winds and heavy rainfall associated with the stormy weather. Numerous stations along the disrupted routes have been impacted. For the most accurate and up-to-date information on affected stations, please consult the Swedish Transport Administration's website or your specific train operator. Ferry services to and from the island of Gotland have also been affected by the adverse weather conditions. Some ferry routes have been cancelled, while others are experiencing significant delays.

=== Storm Alexandros ===
Storm Alexandros
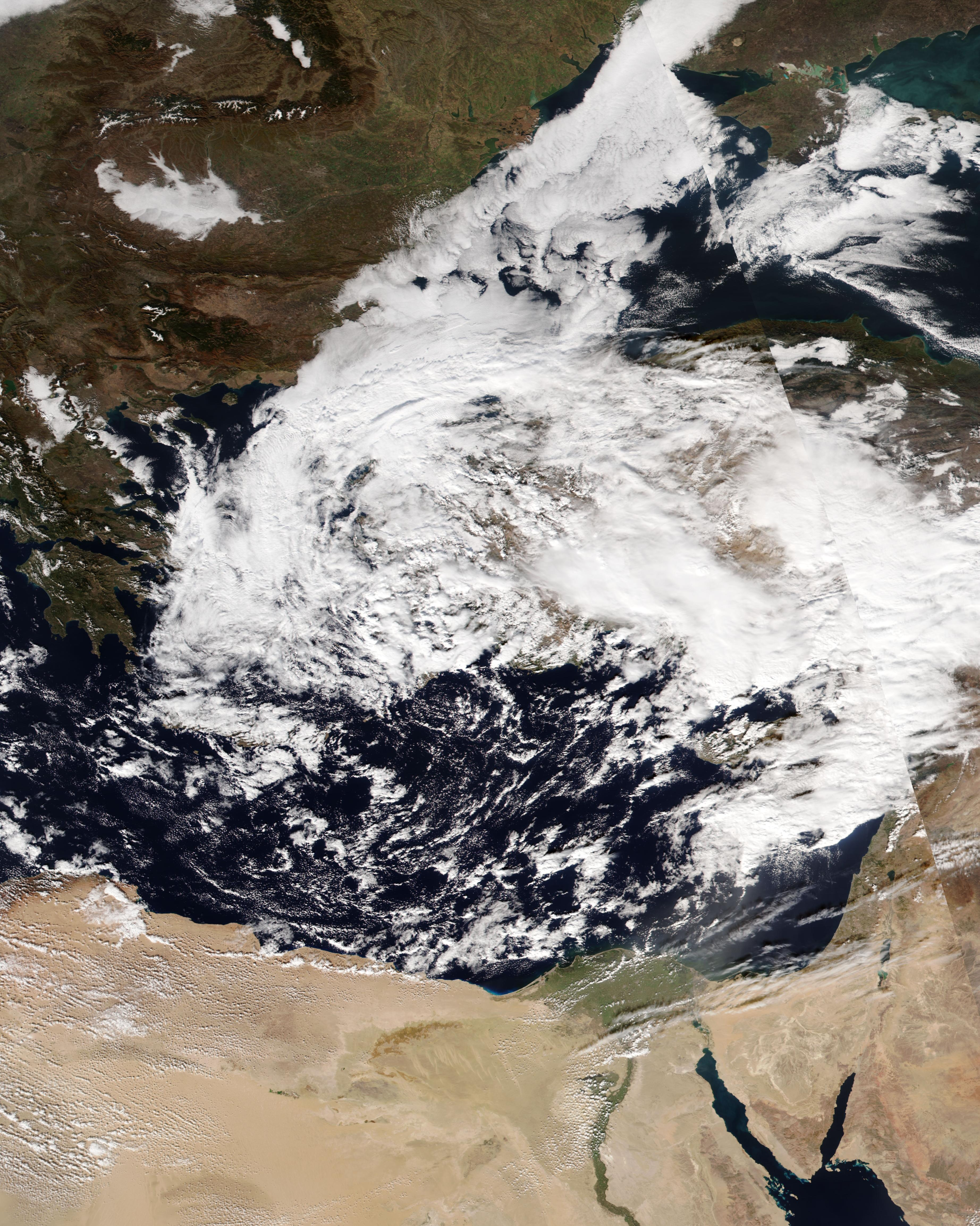
- Area affected: Greece, Turkey, Cyprus
- Date of impact: 16–18 November 2024
- Maximum wind gust: Unspecified
- Lowest pressure: 1,008 hPa (29.77 inHg)
- Fatalities: Unspecified
- Power outages: Unspecified

Storm Alexandros was named by Hellenic National Meteorological Service on 16 November 2024.

The storm brought heavy thunderstorms to Greece and Turkey, prompting a red rain warning to be issued for East Sterea and Evvoia in Greece. Orange rain and thunderstorms were also issued for Thessalia, North East Aegean Islands, Crete and the Dodecanese. Whilst a yellow thunderstorm warning was issued for Cyprus.

The village of Steni on Evia recorded 135 mm of rain, while Seta, also in Evia, had 154 mm, while Skopelos recorded 93 mm up to 16 November. Strong northerly winds blew over mainland Central Greece, Evia and the Aegean Sea, with speeds exceeding 62 mph (100 km/h) in the Karystos area, and 56 mph (90 km/h) in Samothrace.

=== Storm Quiteria ===
Storm Quiteria
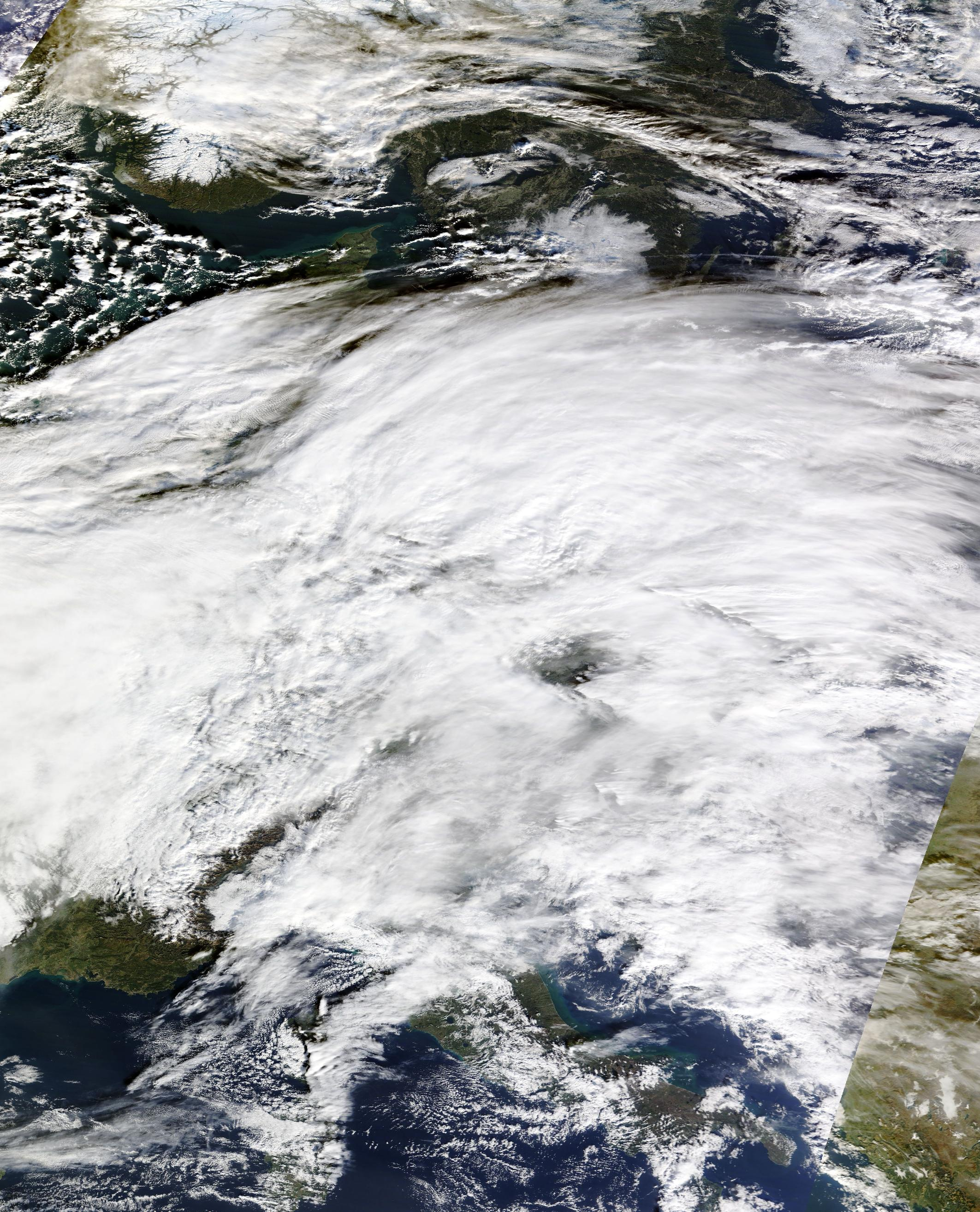
- Area affected: United Kingdom, Ireland, France, Belgium, Luxembourg, Netherlands, Germany, Switzerland, Poland, Denmark, Sweden, Finland, Latvia, Lithuania, Estonia
- Date of impact: 16–22 November 2024
- Maximum wind gust: Unspecified
- Lowest pressure: 965 hPa (28.50 inHg)
- Fatalities: Unspecified
- Power outages: Unspecified

Storm Quiteria was named by Free University of Berlin on 16 November 2024, and brought disruptive snowfall and wind to many parts of Europe.

Many weather warnings were put up for this system across Europe, including, yellow ice warnings for Ireland, yellow snow and ice warnings for many parts of the United Kingdom including Northern Ireland, parts of northern Scotland, south Wales and down the entirety of the east coast of England, excluding the Essex and Kent coasts. Many yellow wind and rain warnings were in force for much of northern France, as well as western parts of the Netherlands where a yellow wind warning was in place.

In Germany a red level 3 wind warning for central and south-western regions where gusts of 70 mph (110 km/h) to 80 mph (130 km/h) was expected. These were encompassed by a large orange level 2 wind warning for the south, central and eastern parts of the country south of Berlin, including the cities of Munich, Stuttgart, Hanover and Leipzig. Switzerland also had in force, orange snow warnings for the Swiss Alps.

Estonia has orange wind warnings, Latvia has orange wind warnings in force for western parts, surrounded in yellow wind warnings. Lithuania has yellow wind warnings in force.

The storm brought heavy snowfall, strong winds, and hazardous road conditions across Finland where rare red warnings were in place for wind and snow, leading to widespread power outages, transportation disruptions, and property damage. Significant snowfall, with accumulations of up to 30 cm in some areas, and strong winds, with gusts reaching 25 meters per second, caused numerous accidents, forced the cancellation of flights and ferry services, and even led to the collapse of a sports hall in Espoo.

In Sweden, a series of warnings were issued in anticipation of the heavy snowfall and strong winds. An orange warning was issued for coastal Gävleborg County on 20–21 November, where accumulations of up to 47 cm was observed in Älvkarleby. A separate orange warning was issued on 22 November for heavy snowfall across the coastal region of Västerbotten County, where accumulations of up to 70 cm were recorded in the vicinity of Bygdsiljum.

=== Storm Caetano (Renate) ===
Storm Caetano
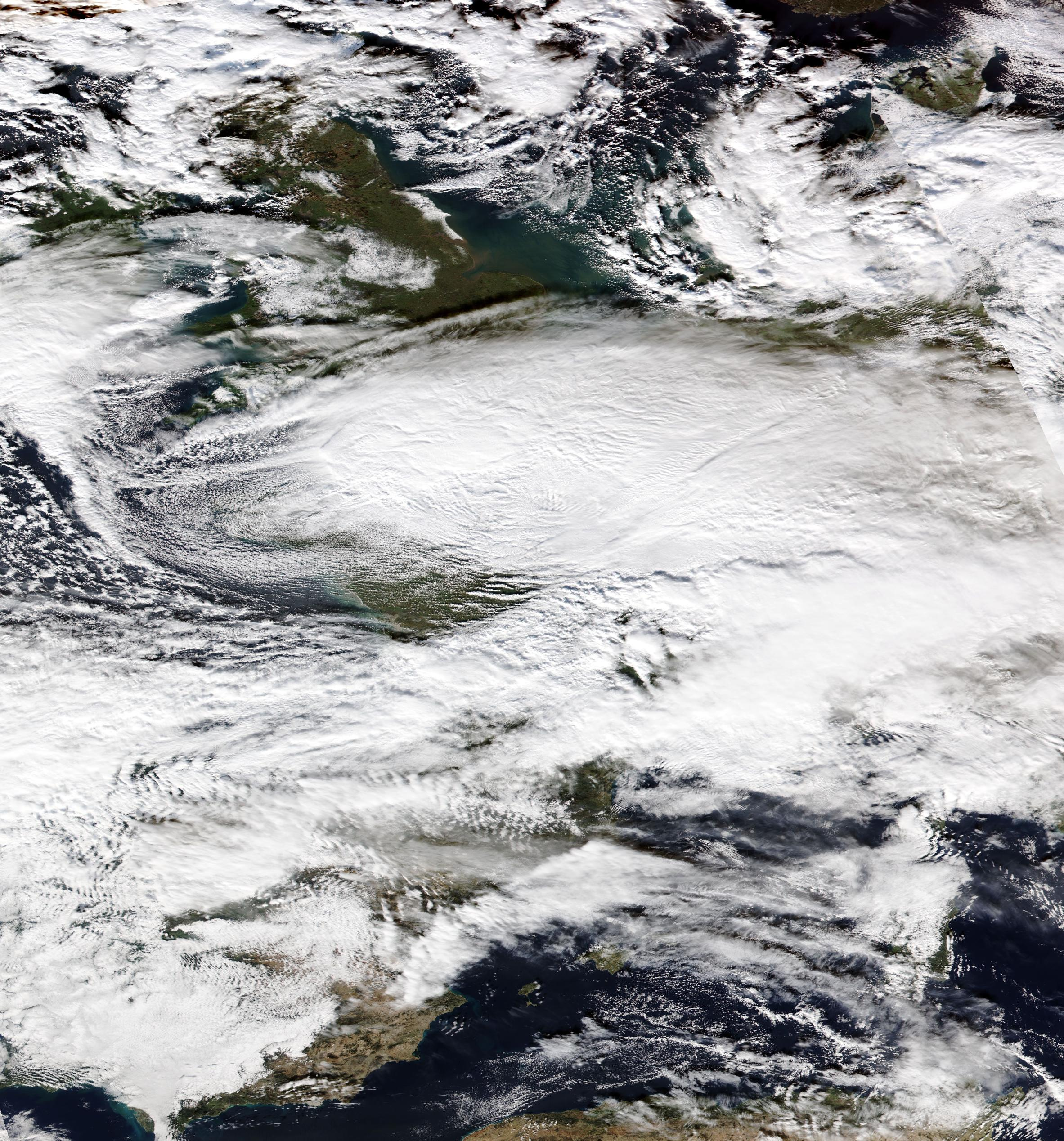
- Area affected: United Kingdom, France, Spain, Germany, Switzerland, Italy, Croatia, Slovenia
- Date of impact: 19–23 November 2024
- Maximum wind gust: Unspecified
- Lowest pressure: 984 hPa (29.06 inHg)
- Fatalities: Unspecified
- Power outages: Unspecified

Storm Caetano was named by the Spanish National Meteorological Agency (AEMET) and "Renate" by the Free University of Berlin on 19 November 2024.

The naming came due to the risk of strong winds and potential heavy snowfall across parts of France, where widespread accumulations of 5–10 cm were expected, with some localized areas potentially receiving up to 20 cm. Parts of the United Kingdom, mainly the high ground in the far southwest, Devon and Cornwall, could have seen some snow on the high ground for a time.

In France, widespread yellow wind, rain, and snow warnings were in effect for southern and northern areas. In between, an orange warning for wind and snow was issued, with blizzard conditions possible in places like Paris, Nantes, and Leon. In Spain, yellow wind warnings were put up for the Spanish-French border regions.

Much of Italy was under an orange snow or ice warning, with an additional orange wind warning for the south. Sardinia was also under an orange wind warning. Switzerland had orange snow and ice warnings in the west and north of the country, with a red snow warning for northwestern areas. This situation was similar for southwestern Germany, where a red snow warning was encompassed by an orange snow warning. Slovenia had yellow snow and rain warnings in force, while Croatia had yellow wind warnings.

=== Storm Bert (Sigrid) ===
Storm Bert
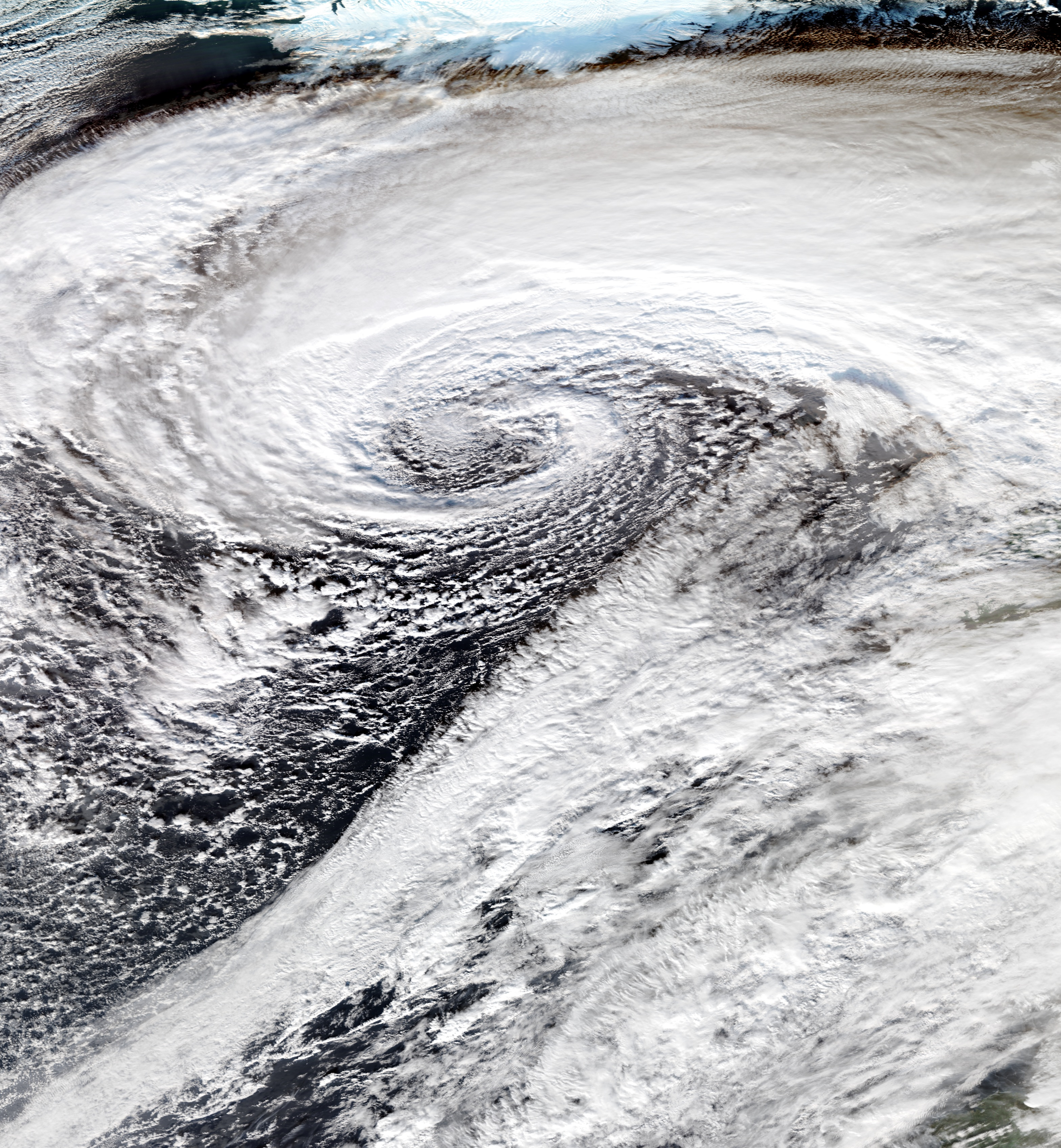
- Area affected: United Kingdom, Ireland
- Date of impact: 21–26 November 2024
- Maximum wind gust: 113 mph (181 km/h): Cairn Gorm, United Kingdom
- Lowest pressure: 940 hPa (27.76 inHg)
- Fatalities: 5
- Power outages: Unspecified

Storm Bert was named by the Irish Met Éireann and Sigrid by Free University of Berlin on 21 November 2024.

Bert brought heavy snow and ice to parts of the UK, particularly in the north, on Thursday and Friday. As the storm passed, heavy rain affected southern and western regions over the weekend. The Met Office issued severe weather warnings and the UK Health Security Agency has issued cold weather alerts. Drivers were advised to take extra care on the roads due to icy conditions.

An amber snow and ice warning was placed for parts of central Scotland, which included parts of Angus, Perth and Kinross, Stirling, Aberdeenshire, the Highlands, and Argyll and Bute. The warning was originally in place from 07:00–17:00 GMT on 23 November but expired earlier. There was also one for northern England from 06:00–11:59. Several yellow wind and rain warnings were issued for parts of England and Wales. A yellow wind warning was issued for the same areas, excluding Angus, and also included Eileanan Siar and Moray. A yellow warning of rain was also issued which included parts of Angus, Clackmannanshire, Perth and Kinross, Stirling, Aberdeenshire, Moray, Dumfries and Galloway, and the Scottish Borders. The next day a yellow wind warning was issued for the Midlands, East Anglia and the London area.

For Ireland, similar impacts are expected from Storm Bert, with Met Éireann issued yellow wind and rain warnings for the whole country. These are likely to be changed and updated as the system nears.

In Ireland, over 34,000 without power. The weather has also brought significant disruption, with several flights disrupted at Newcastle and Dublin airports and extreme flooding in Donegal. Elsewhere, Ferry operator DFDS has cancelled services on some routes until Monday with sailings from Newhaven to Dieppe and Dover to Calais being severely affected.

As a result of the storm there have been five recorded fatalities. A 34-year-old man died after his car "spun off the road" in icy conditions and struck a wall in Shipley, West Yorkshire just before 1 am. Hours later in a separate incident, a second man aged in his 60s was killed when a tree fell onto his vehicle in Hampshire shortly after 7.45 am. In North Wales, the body of a 75-year-old man was recovered from the floods in the Conwy Valley. Five adults and five children have been rescued after a landslide in North Wales. Lancashire Police confirmed a man in his 80s died on Sunday after his car entered a body of water in Colne on Sunday. In Northamptonshire, a man in his forties died in a crash on the A45 near Flore which police have described as an "unexplained death". All 10 people were rescued from the house in Llanarmon Dyffryn Ceiriog, near Llangollen.

Winds from Storm Bert strengthened on Saturday morning, with top gusts of 113 mph (181 km/h) at Cairn Gorm and 82 mph (131 km/h) recorded at Capel Curig in Wales, and 76 mph (122 km/h) at Berry Head, Devon. In Scotland, the Cairngorm mountains saw blizzard conditions and winds of up to 105 mph (169 km/h). Strong winds also forced the closure of the Severn Bridge, which connects Gloucestershire and South Wales.

=== Storm Conall (Telse) ===
Storm Conall
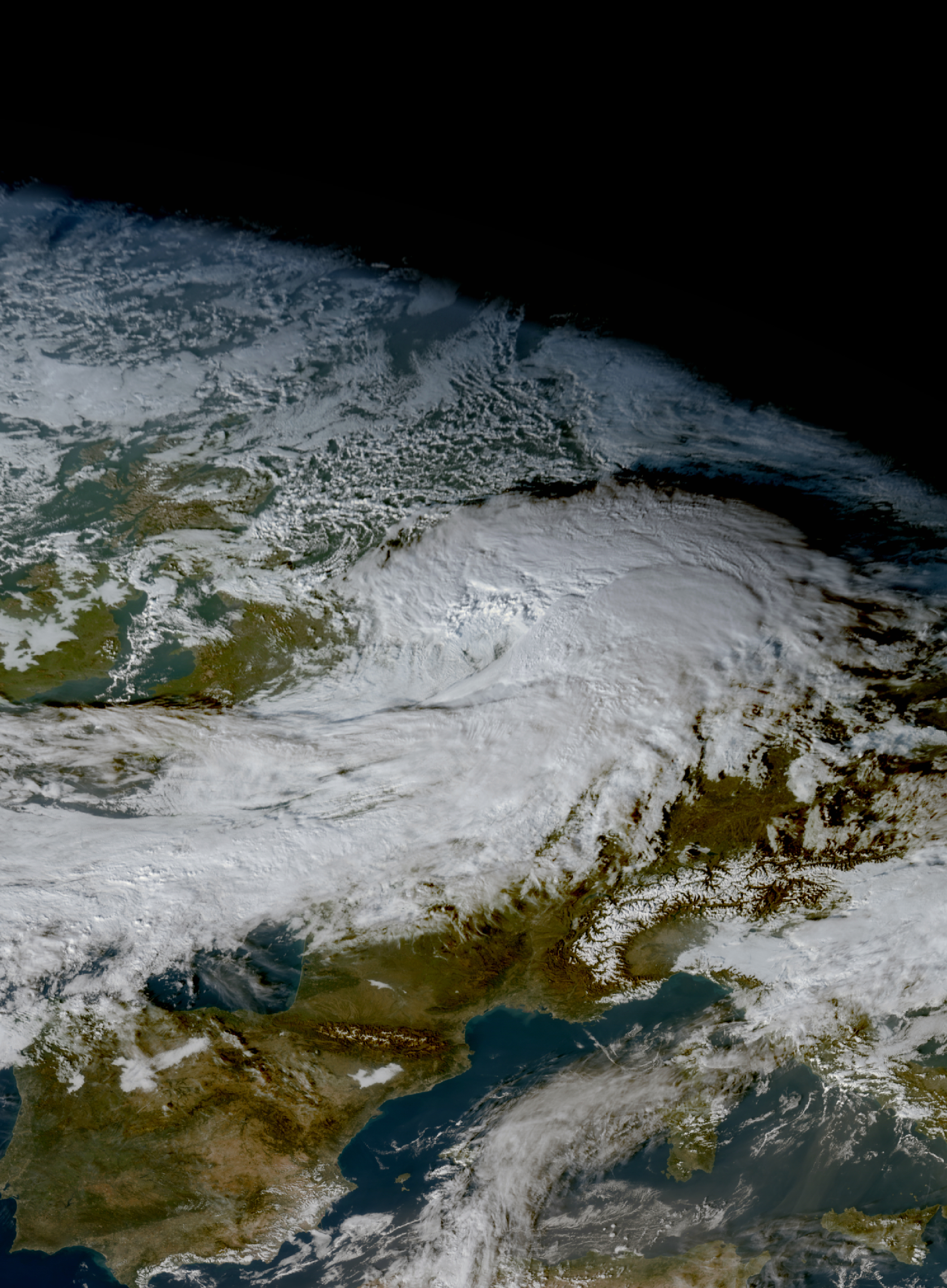
- Area affected: United Kingdom, Netherlands, Denmark, Germany, Poland, France
- Date of impact: 26–29 November 2024
- Maximum wind gust: 79 mph (127 km/h): Vlieland, Netherlands
- Lowest pressure: 994 hPa (29.35 inHg)
- Fatalities: 1
- Power outages: Unspecified

Storm Conall was named by Royal Netherlands Meteorological Institute (KNMI) and Telse by Free University of Berlin on 26 November 2024.

Due to the small size of the storm, impacts were felt in the Netherlands and United Kingdom. A severe weather warning was in place for the Netherlands on Wednesday, 27 November, as Storm Conall approached. Strong winds affected the western and northern parts of the country, leading to potential disruptions. A code yellow alert was issued for several provinces, including Zeeland, South Holland, and Friesland. An orange warning was later added on 27 November.

The United Kingdom Met Office enforced a yellow rain warning in force for much of the south coast of England. Met Office Chief Meteorologist, Steve Willington, said "Much of the warning area will see 15–20 millimetres (0.59–0.79 in) of rain, with 30–40 millimetres (1.2–1.6 in) in some areas. There is a lower chance of 50 millimetres (2.0 in) of rain in a few places, more likely for areas such as the Isle of Wight, Sussex and Kent, before rain eases and clears by early afternoon. Given the recent wet weather, some disruption to travel and infrastructure could be possible.

In the United Kingdom, Storm Conall caused significant disruptions to train services in the region. Thameslink, Gatwick Express, Great Northern, South Western Railway and Southern were among the affected operators. National Rail warned of severe disruptions on parts of the network. Thameslink services to St Albans, Sutton, Bedford and Brighton faced long delays or reductions. Trains between Cambridge and Brighton were suspended. Tunnels at Farringdon and Bletchingley were flooded. Great Western Railway and South Western Railway reported delays in the Southampton area due to flooding and a fallen tree, impacting journeys to and from Cardiff Central, Bristol Temple Meads, London Waterloo and Portsmouth.

The Met Office recorded 43.3 millimetres (1.70 in) of rainfall in a 24-hour period on the Isle of Wight.

Storm Conall, brought strong winds exceeding 79 mph (127 km/h) to the Netherlands. This led to widespread travel disruptions, such as train services being delayed and adjusted. Also, over 100 flights at Schiphol Airport were cancelled or delayed. Ferry services to the Wadden Islands were disrupted or cancelled, and severe traffic jams were reported across the country.

In Denmark, warnings for heavy rain were raised for Southern Jutland, Funen, South Zealand, Møn, Lolland and Falster. In Germany, orange level 2 wind warnings were in force for central, western and north-western parts of the country.

=== Storm Bora ===
Storm Bora
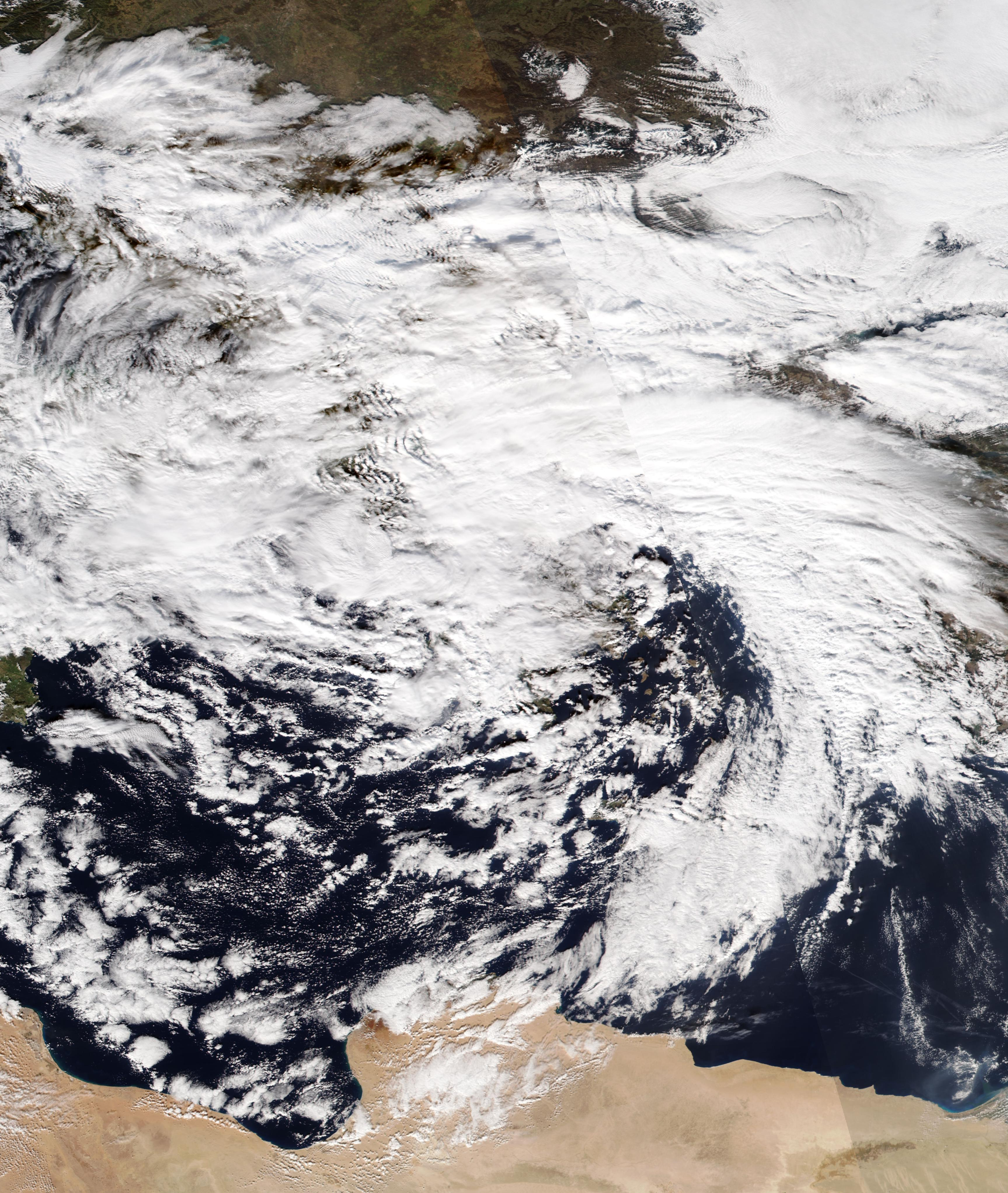
- Area affected: Greece, North Macedonia, Bulgaria, Kosovo, Albania, Serbia, Montenegro, Turkey, Italy
- Date of impact: 29 November – 3 December 2024
- Maximum wind gust: Unspecified
- Lowest pressure: 1,008 hPa (29.77 inHg)
- Fatalities: 3
- Power outages: Unspecified

Storm Bora was named by the Greek Hellenic National Meteorological Service on 29 November 2024.

Yellow rain and thunderstorm warnings were raised for parts of southwestern Greece as well as North Macedonia and Kosovo where impacts were felt. Furthermore, orange rain warnings were also in force for West Macedonia and East Macedonia.

The heaviest rainfall on 30 November 2024, was recorded in Central and East Macedonia, Rhodes, Chania, and Lemnos. The highest rainfall was recorded in Neochori, Chalkidiki, at 208 millimetres (8.2 in); followed by Rhodes, at 171 millimetres (6.7 in); and Thasos at 158 millimetres (6.2 in). Wind gusts of over 80 kilometres per hour (50 mph) were recorded in Thessaloniki. In the morning hours of 1 December, the heaviest rainfall was recorded in Central Macedonia, in the regional units of Chalkidiki, Imathia and Pella, and the island of Rhodes. In Simonopetra, a rainfall total of 170.6 millimetres (6.72 in) was recorded in the early hours of 1 December, followed by Neochori, Chalkidiki, at 160.8 millimetres (16.08 cm); Rhodes city, at 146.8 millimetres (5.78 in); and Veria, at 98 millimetres (3.9 in). The highest cumulative rainfall up to 2 December was recorded at Simonopetra, at 550.8 millimetres (21.69 in), Neochori, Chalkidiki, at 452.4 millimetres (17.81 in) and Rhodes, 341 millimetres (13.4 in).

One man drowned when he was swept by a torrent in Lemnos. On the same island the village of Kontias was ordered to be evacuated due to a nearby dam overflowing, while flooding was also observed in Thanos and Myrina, the island's capital. In Rhodes the heavy rainfall lead to the damages in the road network and thus travel was banned. Snow fell in Florina and Kastoria, leading to power outages in some mountain villages. A tourist bus stacked in the snow near Kleisoura, Kastoria. A second person died in Lemnos following a fall as they were clearing debris, while a third died of hypothermia after being stranded in Chalkidiki. A state of emergency was declared for a month in Rhodes, with the heaviest hit areas being Ialysos, Pastida, Maritsa, Kalythies, Damatria and Faliraki, where a bridge was damaged, and the municipal units of Myrina, Atsiki, and Nea Koutali in Lemnos.

=== Storm Darragh (Xaveria) ===
Storm Darragh
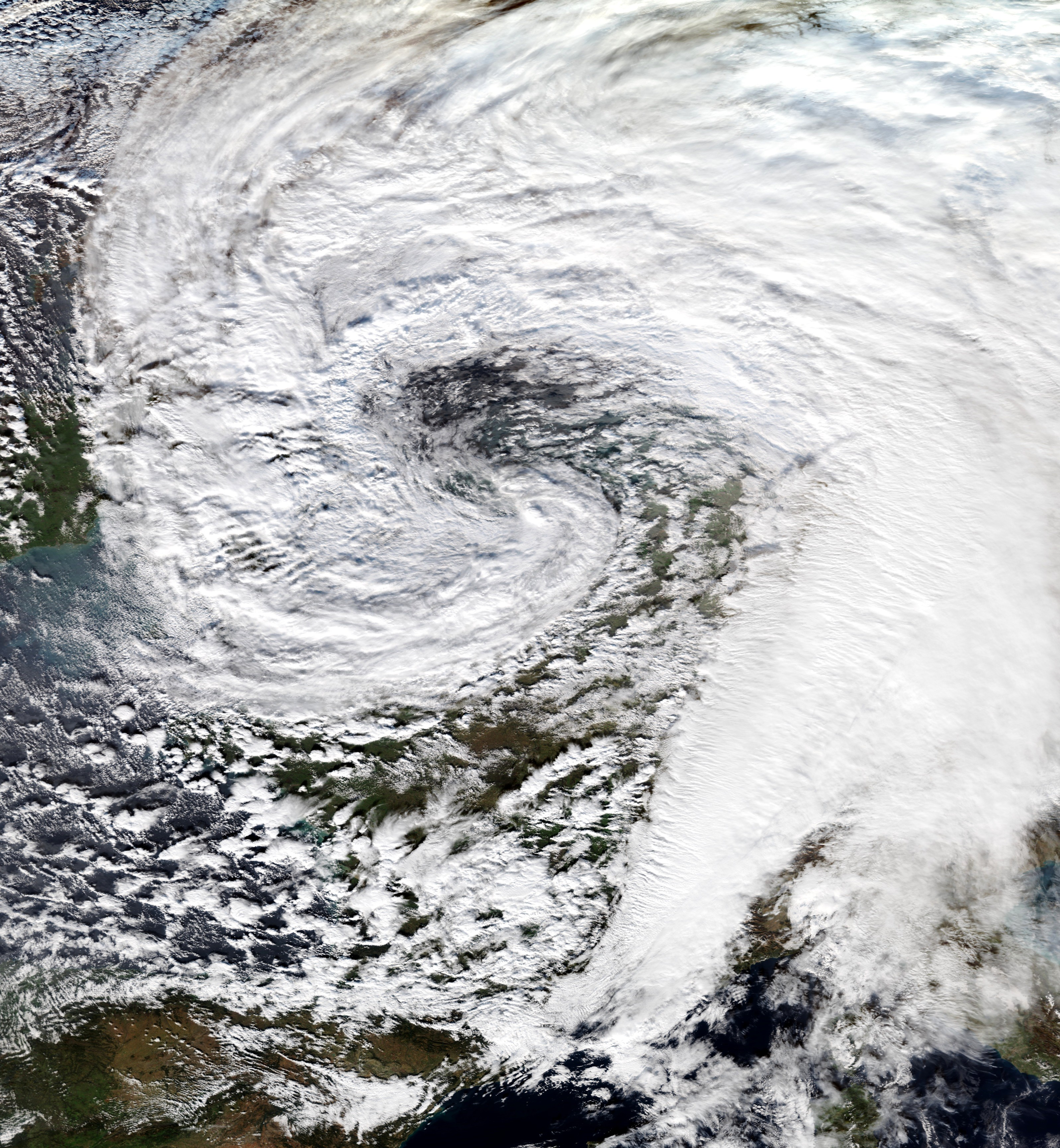
- Area affected: United Kingdom, Ireland, Netherlands, Belgium, France
- Date of impact: 5–10 December 2024
- Maximum wind gust: 96 mph (154 km/h) at Berry Head
- Lowest pressure: 977 hPa (28.85 inHg)
- Fatalities: 4
- Power outages: 2.3 million

Storm Darragh was named by the UK's Met Office. It was named Xaveria by Free University of Berlin, on 5 December 2024.

Darragh prompted the issuance of amber wind warnings for southwestern Scotland, Wales and western English counties including Devon and Cornwall and Northern Ireland, in the amber warning areas, the Met Office says, Storm Darragh will bring strong winds on Saturday. Expect gusts of 70–80 mph (110–130 km/h) on coasts, 60–70 mph (97–113 km/h) inland. Large waves and severe coastal conditions likely. Winds will ease from the west later. A broad yellow wind warning was also in force for all of England, southern-central and eastern Scotland, where the Met Office says, gusts of 40–50 mph (64–80 km/h) inland, 60–70 mph (97–113 km/h) on coasts, and locally up to 80 mph (130 km/h). Difficult driving conditions and travel disruptions are also likely. Authorities set yellow rain warnings for parts of central Wales and southern Scotland and northern England, and northern Ireland some flooding could occur from heavy rain.

On the morning of Friday 6 December, the Met Office upgraded this to a red weather warning for the Welsh coast from Anglesey to the Severn Estuary and round to Somerset between 3am GMT and 11am GMT on Saturday, with gusts of 90 mph [140 km/h] or more possible over coasts and hills of west and south Wales...funnelling through the Bristol Channel with some very large waves on exposed beaches and amber warnings in place until 9pm more broadly. On 6 December the Football Association of Wales announced the postponement of all matches in Wales on 7 December in leagues under its authority. Around three million people in Wales and South West England were also sent emergency alerts as the storm approached the UK.

Red warnings were put in force for "extremely strong and gusty northwest winds" between 9pm or 10pm until 2am or 3am overnight on Friday 6 December for counties Mayo, Clare, Galway, Donegal, Leitrim, and Sligo in Ireland, where fallen trees, damage to power lines, dangerous travelling conditions, structural damage, and wave overtopping as potential risks. The rest of the Republic of Ireland was issued amber warnings. A yellow wind and rain warning was in force for the rest of the country where impacts from flooding and wind can occur.

In France, Meteo France has issued orange wind warnings for English channel regions where high waves and strong winds are anticipated. In response to the alert, SNCF suspended all rail services in Normandy from 7–8 December, as well as some services in Brittany, Pays de la Loire and Nouvelle-Aquitaine.

As the storm impacted, a major incident was declared for much of Wales as a result of severe weather caused by Storm Darragh. Dyfed-Powys Police has declared a major incident for the counties of Carmarthenshire, Ceredigion, Pembrokeshire, and Powys because of disruption caused by the storm.

A man in his 40s died after a tree fell on his van while driving on a dual carriageway near Longton in Lancashire. A second man died after a tree fell on his car while driving through a residential street in Birmingham.

In the Netherlands, over 100 flights at Schiphol Airport were cancelled on 6 December due to the storm.

=== Storm Dorothea (Anka) ===
Storm Dorothea
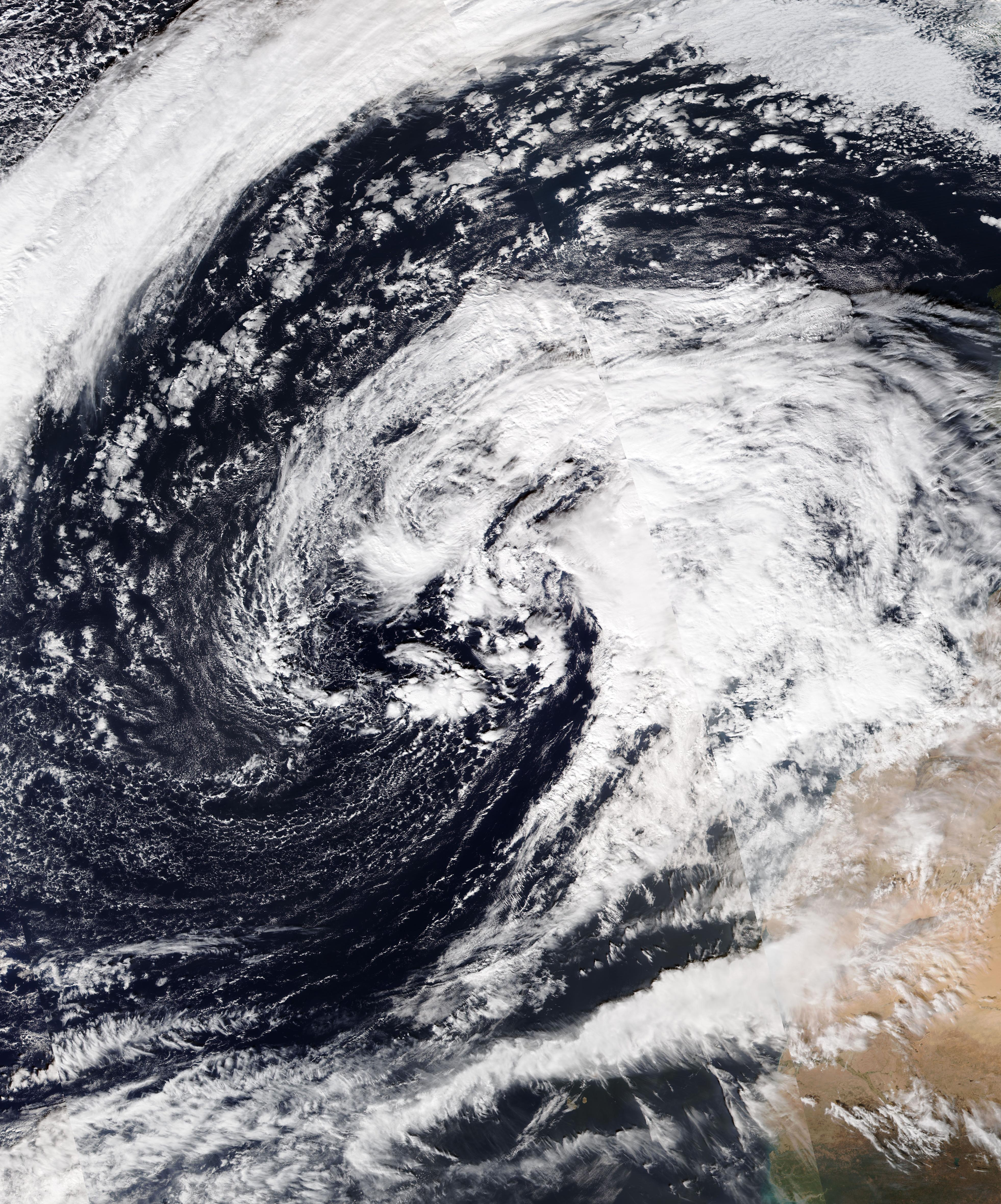
- Area affected: Azores, Canary Islands, Ireland, United Kingdom, Norway, Sweden
- Date of impact: 15–22 December 2024
- Maximum wind gust: Unspecified
- Lowest pressure: 963 hPa (28.44 inHg)
- Fatalities: Unspecified
- Power outages: Unspecified

Storm Dorothea was named by the Spanish AEMET and Anka by Free University of Berlin on 15 December 2024.

The storm brought strong winds and heavy rains to the Canary Islands, causing nearly 100 incidents. Strong winds have led to road closures, flight disruptions, and school closures on Tenerife, El Hierro, and La Gomera. With an orange wind warning being issued for the islands. Laois - Met Éireann - The Irish Meteorological Service For the Canary Islands, the strongest recorded wind gust there was 86 mph (138 km/h) at Arure, on the island of La Gomera. As the storm moved north it intensified, likely bringing its strongest winds to Ireland and the United Kingdom.

The storm also brought strong winds to the Azores prompting a yellow wind warning for a time on 15 December. Laois - Met Éireann - The Irish Meteorological Service For the United Kingdom, a yellow wind warning was issued for south-western parts of Scotland, eastern Northern Ireland and west Wales where 60 mph were expected. Laois - Met Éireann - The Irish Meteorological Service In Ireland, Met Éireann has only issued a coastal yellow wind warning.

In Norway, the Norwegian Meteorological Institute issued a yellow wind and snow warnings for western parts of the country where 10–25 cm of snow is expected and locally strong wind gusts around 27–36 m/s (40 mph (64 km/h) - 80 mph (130 km/h)) are expected from northwest, strongest wind near the coast and in mountain areas. As a result of this, a red avalanche warning was in force for these areas.

In Sweden, warnings were issued nationwide. On 17 December, yellow warnings for black ice were put out throughout southern Svealand. Additionally, yellow warnings for accumulating snow were issued for northern and central Sweden for 17–19 December At the same time, two orange warnings were issued for the mountainous regions due to heavy snow and wind. Furthermore, on 19 December, another yellow warning for snow and wind was issued along the northern Norrland coast.

=== Storm Sif (Ziva) ===
Storm Sif
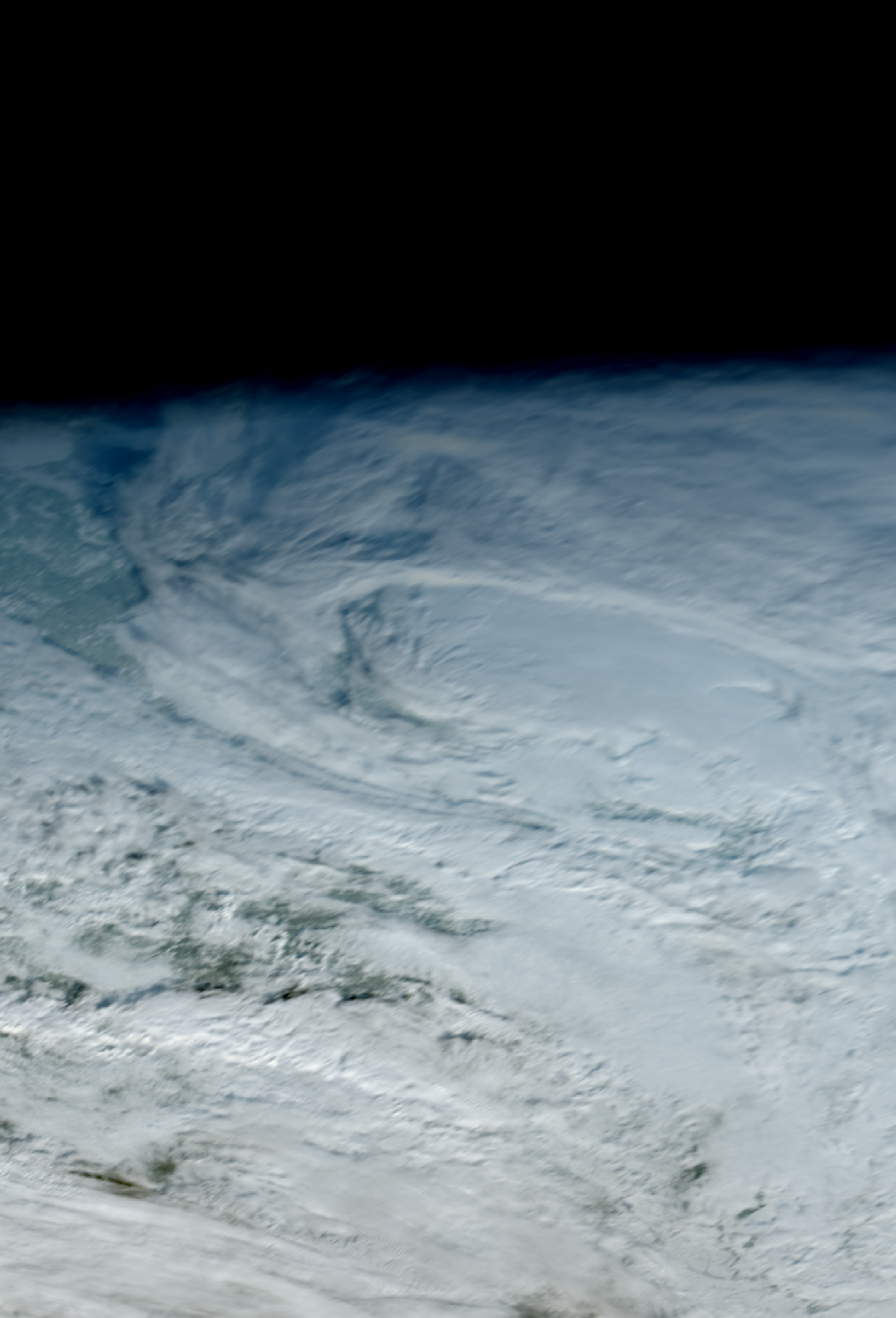
- Area affected: Iceland, Norway, Denmark, Sweden, Germany, Poland, Finland, Estonia, Latvia, Lithuania, Ukraine
- Date of impact: 16–18 December 2024
- Maximum wind gust: Unspecified
- Lowest pressure: 973 hPa (28.73 inHg)
- Fatalities: Unspecified
- Power outages: Unspecified

Storm Sif was named by the Danish Met service and Ziva by Free University of Berlin on 16 December 2024.

In Denmark, rain and wind hit much of the country Thursday morning. The worst weather was in the morning, especially in northern Jutland. The rain eased off in the afternoon, particularly in northern Jutland. Strong winds and gusts hit the west coast of Jutland Thursday evening.

Many yellow and orange warnings were issued for this system including level 2 orange wind warnings for northern parts of Germany surrounded by a level 1 yellow warning. With red warnings for wind in central parts of the country Orange wind warnings where also in force for northern and north-eastern Poland with disruption expected. There is also a red wind warning for the north-eastern coastal zone in northern Poland.

In Ukraine a large orange wind warning was in force for western, northern and central parts of the country. For Estonia, Latvia and Lithuania a yellow wind warning was in force for all areas with an orange wind warning for western areas. Also, Finland had a large orange snow and ice warning in force for central and eastern areas.

=== Storm Bianca ===
Storm Bianca
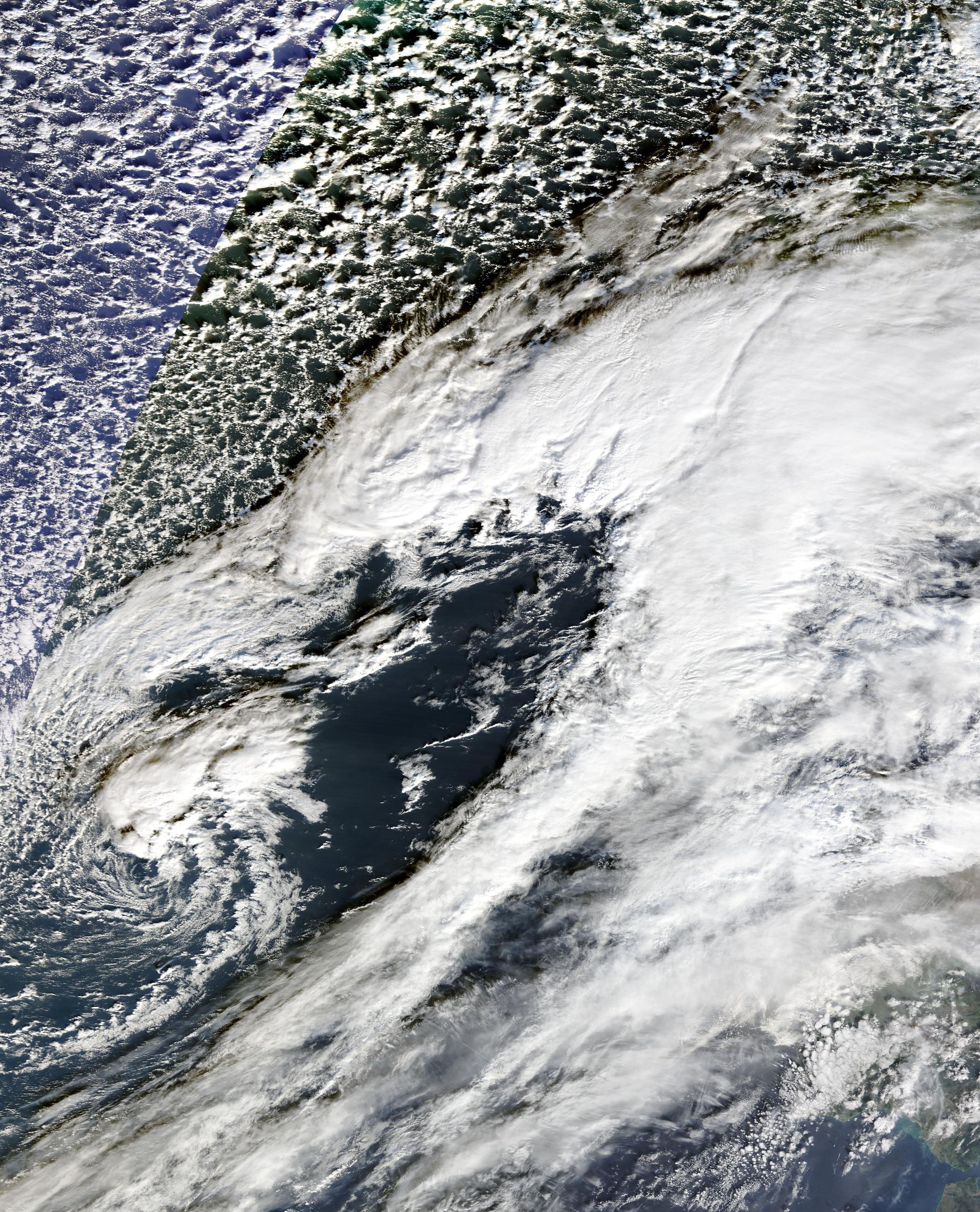
- Area affected: United Kingdom, France, Belgium, Netherlands, Germany, Denmark
- Date of impact: 17–19 December 2024
- Maximum wind gust: Unspecified
- Lowest pressure: 980 hPa (28.94 inHg)
- Fatalities: Unspecified
- Power outages: Unspecified

Storm Bianca was named by Free University of Berlin on 14 December 2024

Severe weather warnings where issued by the German Met Office (Deutscher Wetterdienst). This included an orange wind warning for northern and north-western parts of the country where strong winds are expected from the southwest, with gusts reaching 40 mph (64 km/h), potentially up to 50 mph (80 km/h) in exposed areas. Deutscher Wetterdienst also issued a red wind warning for central parts where, above 1000 metres, wind gusts of 100–120 km/h (62–75 mph), were expected. Deutscher Wetterdienst says, these extreme winds pose significant risks, including falling trees, power lines, and debris, as well as potential structural damage to buildings.

In France, a yellow wind warning was issued by Meteo France for channel regions and north-western France, including Nantes, Brest, Caen, Calais, Dunkirk and Lille. In these areas moderate damage is possible. Although there were no weather warnings in force for the United Kingdom for this system, a large area of rainfall moved over the southern half of England and Wales were localised impacts were possible. This may exacerbate already flood vulnerable areas with flood warnings pre-existing by the Environment Agency.

=== Storm Dionisio ===
Storm Dionisio
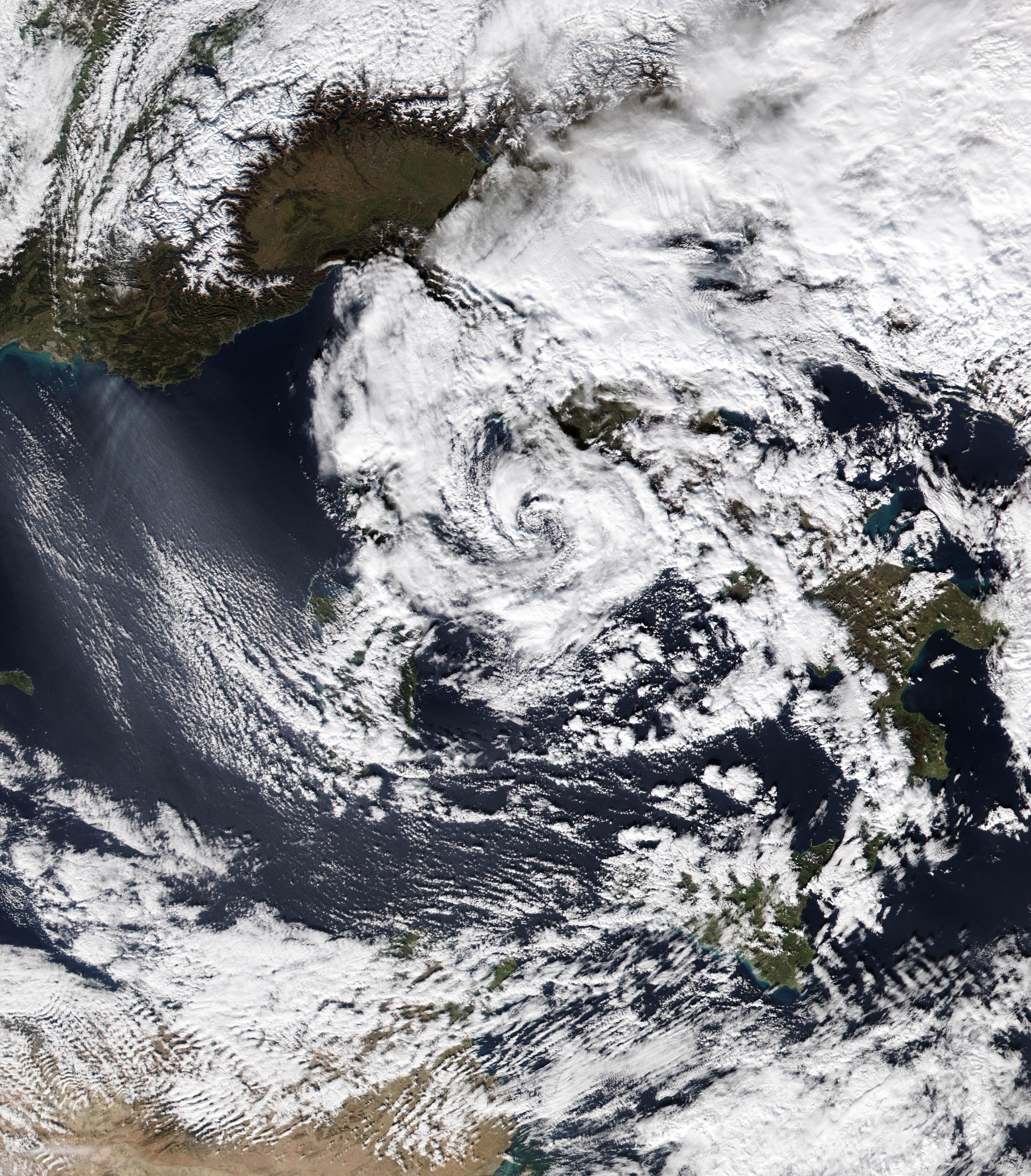
- Area affected: Italy, Slovenia, Croatia, Bosnia and Herzegovina, Greece
- Date of impact: 18–21 December 2024
- Maximum wind gust: Unspecified
- Lowest pressure: 996 hPa (29.41 inHg)
- Fatalities: Unspecified
- Power outages: Unspecified

Storm Dionisio was named on 18 December 2024, by the Italian Servizio Meteorologico.

In response, entirety of Italy was under an orange wind warning with the island of Sardinia being put under a red wind warning. Meanwhile, in Croatia red wind warnings were in force for all coastal areas with an orange warning for wind for areas on land near the coast. Strongest wind gusts could between 40 and 85 mph (64 and 137 km/h) according to the Croatian Meteorological Office. In Slovenia an orange wind warning was in force for western parts of the country where winds could gust between 45 and 50 (70–85 km/h).

For Bosnia and Herzegovina, yellow wind and rain warnings were in force for the country with an orange wind warning down the western border with Croatia. Greece, had orange rain and thunderstorm warnings for western regions due to the threat of flooding in areas which was expected to cause some disruption.

=== Storm Enol (Diana) ===
Storm Enol (Diana)
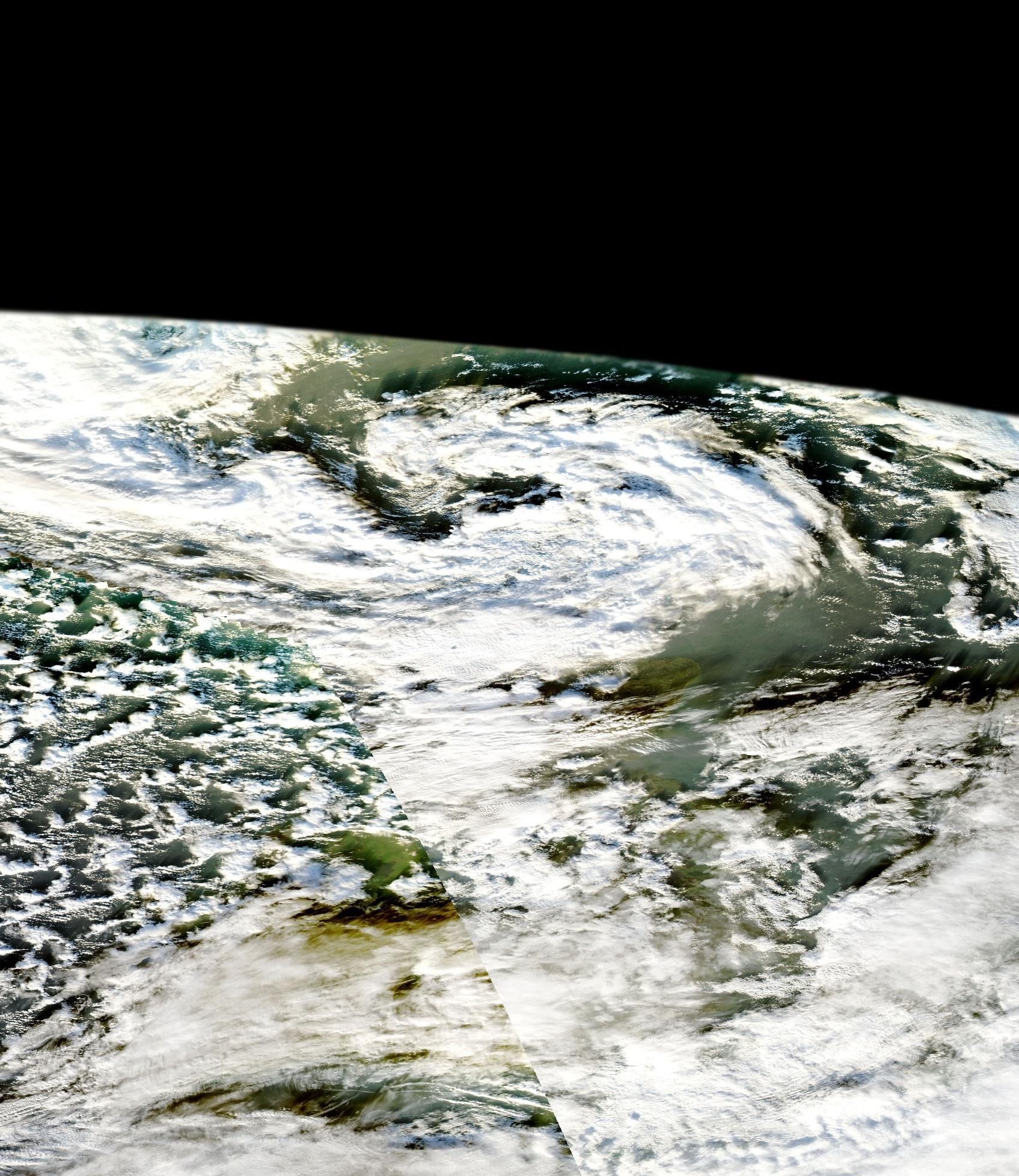
- Area affected: United Kingdom, Ireland, Netherlands, France
- Date of impact: 20–23 December 2024
- Maximum wind gust: 82 mph (132 km/h) at Kirkwall & South Uist
- Lowest pressure: 957 hPa (28.26 inHg)
- Fatalities: Unspecified
- Power outages: Unspecified

Storm Enol was named by Meteo France and Diana by Free University of Berlin on 20 December 2024.

The severe storm disrupted travel in Scotland and Northern England, the weekend before Christmas. The UK Met Office controversially did not name the storm being called Éowyn (its name in Ireland). Elsewhere it was named: Enol by the South-western group, though of the lesser impact there, and Diana in the most liberally naming, centre and north continental zone.

Broad yellow wind warnings covered most of Scotland, Northern Ireland, Western England and Wales. For northern Scotland, strong westerlies on Saturday saw a deep low accompany: forecast gusts of 65-75 mph, exceptionally five greater. Coasts saw large waves, especially causeways. Sunday wind warnings expanded to the south-west of England and all of Northern Ireland, 50-60 mph gusts across warned zones. Higher gusts of 70 mph may have hit coastal and hilly regions, especially in the north and west. Squally showers were likely, hail and thunder possible.

A yellow wind warning beset parts of western Ireland. Strong and gusty westerly winds were due, shifting to north-westerly. Large waves were anticipated along the coast. Impacts included minor coastal flooding, sea spray, and difficult travel conditions, particularly near the coast. The risk to trees and so transport was highlighted. The strongest winds were from Saturday night into Sunday morning.

On 22 December KNMI issued a yellow wind warning for northern parts of the Netherlands: strong winds with gusts reaching approximately 75 km/h (47 mph). Along the coast, gusts may have hit between 80 and 90 km/h (50 and 56 mph). France issued orange wind warnings for north-western regions.

Heathrow Airport cancelled around 100 flights due to strong winds and airspace restrictions. National Rail warned of possible disruption to journeys across Scotland, Wales, and England. ScotRail announced speed restrictions and potential service cancellations or delays. Road (bus) replacement briefly succeeded the First Great Western. Northern Trains saw high cancellation rates due to staff shortages. Some trains to Gatwick and Stansted airports had had points failures. Cumbria saw gusts of 76 mph.

A gust of 82 mph was recorded in South Uist and Kirkwall.

=== Storm Elena ===
Storm Elena
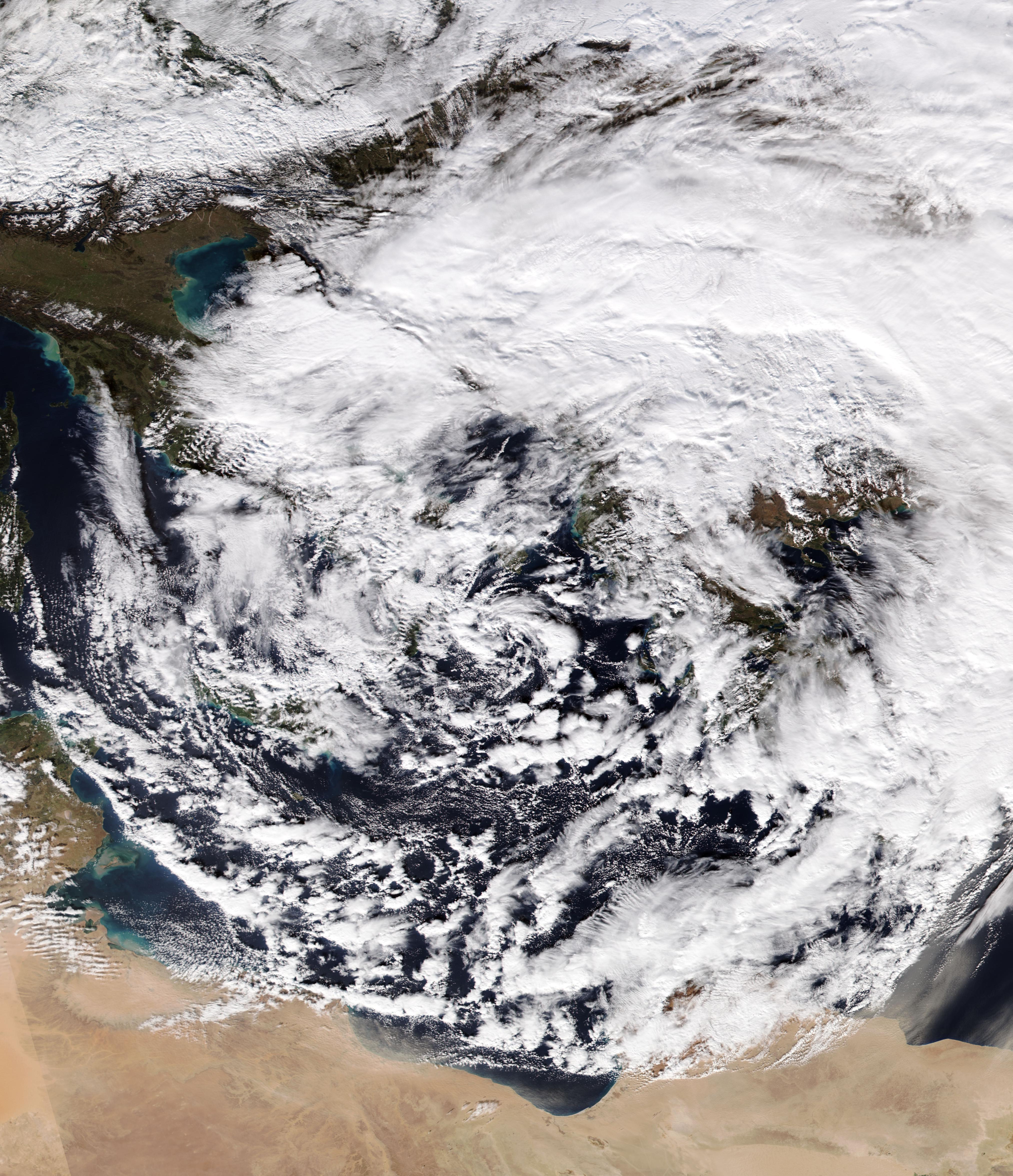
- Area affected: Italy, Slovenia, Croatia, Bosnia and Herzegovina, Kosovo, Serbia, Greece
- Date of impact: 23–27 December 2024
- Maximum wind gust: Unspecified
- Lowest pressure: 989 hPa (29.21 inHg)
- Fatalities: Unspecified
- Power outages: Unspecified

Storm Elena was named by the Italian Servizio Meteorologico on 23 December 2024.

Orange wind warnings were in force for northern, central and southern Italy, including Sardinia. As well as northern and southern regions of Croatia with a red wind warning for coastal western parts. Western Bosnia and Herzegovina also had an orange wind warning in force. Also, orange snow warnings were in force for north-eastern Croatia, western Bosnia and Herzegovina, western Serbia, all of Kosovo and the region of West Macedonia in Greece. A red snow warning was also in force for north-west Serbia. Also in Greece existed an orange rain warning for Epirus, Greece.

The heavy rain caused flooding in Poseidonos Avenue, Athens, and in villages of central Euboea on Christmas Day. The road leading to the top of Parnitha was closed due to snowfall. The Peace and Friendship Stadium in Piraeus flooded from water leaking from the roof, leading to damages at the floor, gym and cube of the stadium. On 25 and 26 December, Seta, Euboea, received 348.4 mm of rain, Steni Dirfyos, Euboea, received 326.8 mm, and Vilia, Attica, received 270 mm of rain.

=== Storm Floriane (Bernd) ===
Storm Floriane
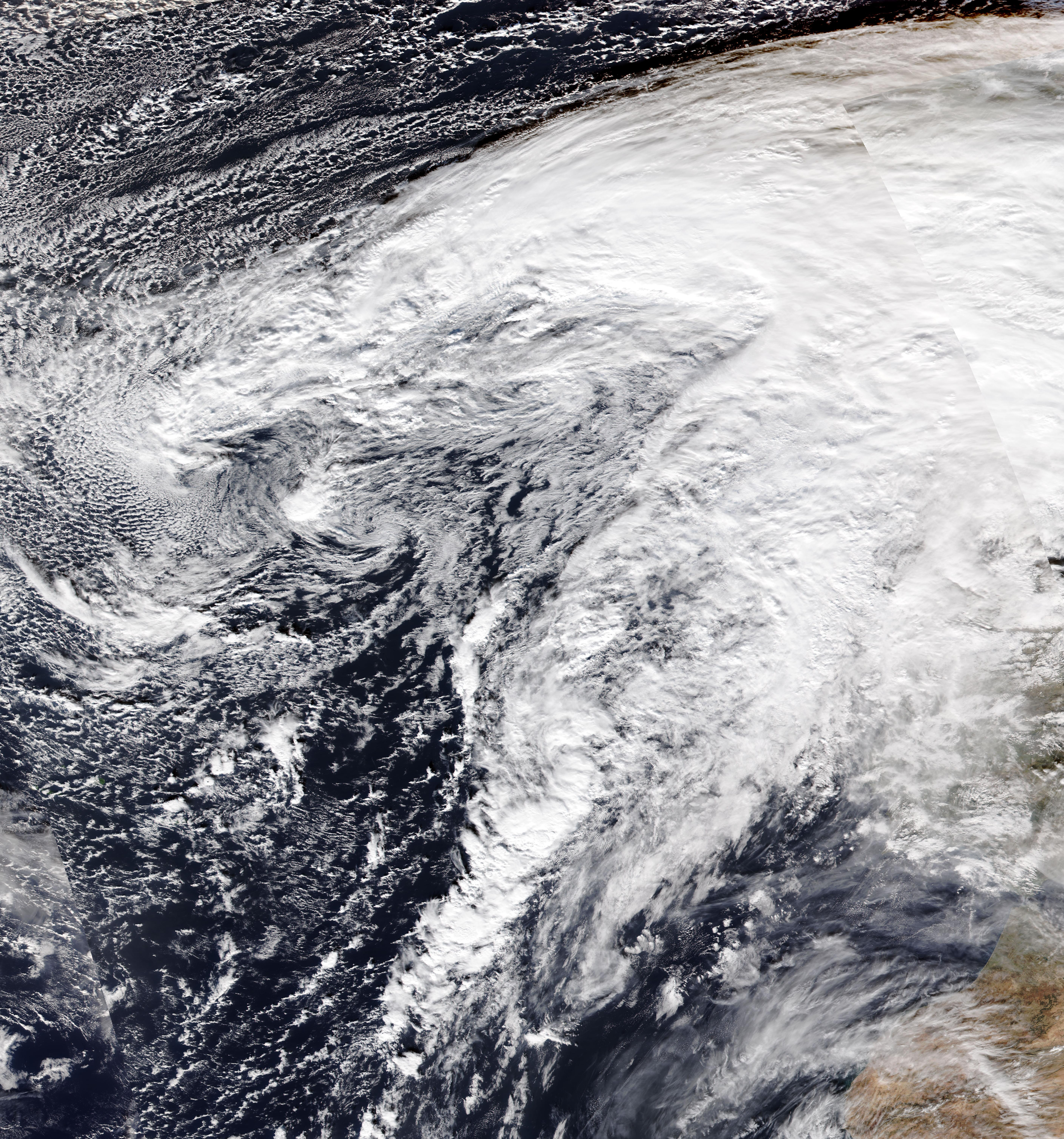
- Area affected: United Kingdom, Ireland, Netherlands, Belgium, Norway, Sweden, Denmark, Germany, France, Spain, Portugal
- Date of impact: 2–9 January 2025
- Maximum wind gust: Unspecified
- Lowest pressure: 952 hPa (28.11 inHg)
- Fatalities: Unspecified
- Power outages: Unspecified

Storm Bernd was named by the Free University of Berlin on 2 January 2025. It was later named Floriane by Meteo France a day after impacting the United Kingdom and Ireland with heavy snowfall.

In the United Kingdom, the Met Office issued an amber snow & ice warning for the north Midlands and inland parts of Wales. The Met Office said, severe winter weather brought significant disruption across the region. Snow and freezing rain created hazardous travel conditions, with widespread road closures, delays to public transport, and widespread power outages. Heavy snow accumulations were observed, reaching up to 30 cm in mountainous areas. Ice accretion was a concern, particularly in Wales. While milder air arrived on Sunday, leading to rapid thawing, significant disruption occurred in the meantime. Elsewhere, in northern England and amber snow warning was in force where snow will be persistent and heavy at times, and will likely drift in brisk easterly winds, especially over higher ground. The Met Office says, much of the warning area can expect 3–7 cm of snow. Areas above about 150 m will likely see 15–30 cm, with 40 cm for ground above 300 m, before snow begins to ease and clear by the end of Sunday. A wider yellow snow warning encompassed the amber one, including areas like west Wales, the inland parts near the south coast, the London area and around Norwich, excluding coastal areas of the south and the far east of England. A yellow snow warning was also in force for parts of Scotland for an extra day.

In Ireland, Met Éireann issued yellow rain and snow warnings for southern counties, and yellow snow and ice warnings for more central and northern areas. However, an orange snow warning was issued for these counties; Leinster, Cavan, Donegal, Monaghan, Clare, Limerick, Tipperary, Waterford, Connacht. In Belgium the met service issued a yellow snow and ice warning for all areas. Whilst the Netherlands did the same. Germany issued a yellow level 1 snow warning for all areas, with an orange level 2 wind warning for north-eastern areas.

The Environment Agency has warned that melting snow is increasing the risk of flooding across England. Significant river flooding is predicted nationwide as rain becomes the primary hazard. Heavy snowfall previously caused widespread disruption, including airport closures at Manchester, Liverpool, Bristol, Birmingham, Leeds Bradford. Train services were also severely impacted. Power outages occurred in the Midlands, southwest England, and South Wales, and the National Grid is working to restore electricity. An amber weather warning for snow remains in effect for northern England until midnight. Flooding has already begun to affect train services, with delays reported between London St Pancras International and St Albans, and between Frome and Taunton. In Ireland, Dublin Airport remained open. However, about 24,000 homes, farms and businesses were without power.

As this all happened, Meteo France officially named Storm Floriane, which is expected to bring strong winds down the east coast of England and through France. Orange wind warnings were issued for inland, northern regions of France from Ardennes south-west to Vendée.

On 5 January, a tornado associated with a low-pressure area of the storm caused damage in a small community in Portugal.

=== Storm Felix ===
Storm Felix
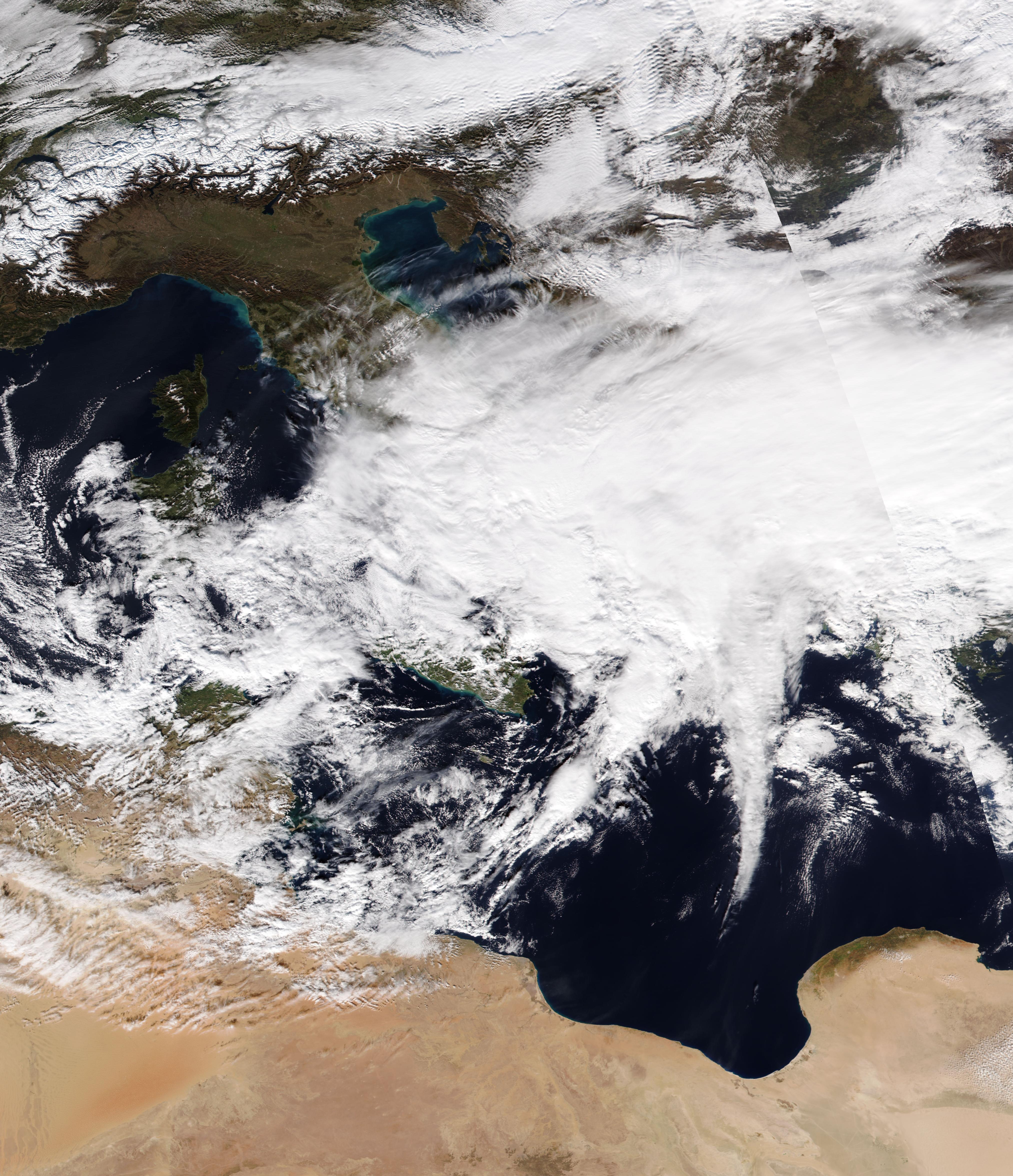
- Area affected: Italy, Croatia, Greece, Bosnia & Herzegovina
- Date of impact: 11–15 January 2025
- Maximum wind gust: Unspecified
- Lowest pressure: 1,004 hPa (29.65 inHg)
- Fatalities: Unspecified
- Power outages: Unspecified

Storm Felix was named by the Italian Servizio Meteorologico on 11 January 2025.

The storm was expected to impact Italy, bringing heavy rainfall and strong winds to the central and western parts of the country. An orange wind warning was issued by Servizio Meteorologico for the regions of Liguria, Tuscany, Campania, Calabria and Sardinia. With a broad yellow warning for rain and thunderstorms for central and southern parts of Italy. The next day the orange warning for wind was expanded to north-eastern regions. These include, Abruzzo, Marche, Emilia-Romagna and Veneto. Then the next day the whole country.

In Croatia red wind warnings were in effect for the Rijeka region. Gales, locally hurricane-force gusts with average wind speeds of more than 55 mph (89 km/h); were expected with more than 80 mph (130 km/h) in gusts. Uprooted trees, broken branches and flying debris, Large-scale building damage, traffic interruptions and power outages are expected. Red wind warnings existed in areas offshore western regions, with an orange warning for wind for the Dubrovnik region.

An orange wind warning was issued in Bosnia and Herzegovina for the Trebinje region, with wind gusts between 50 and 80 km/h anticipated. Structural damage, and the risk of injury from uprooted trees and wind-borne debris were expected, with interruptions in electricity supply are possible.

=== Storm Gabri ===
Storm Gabri
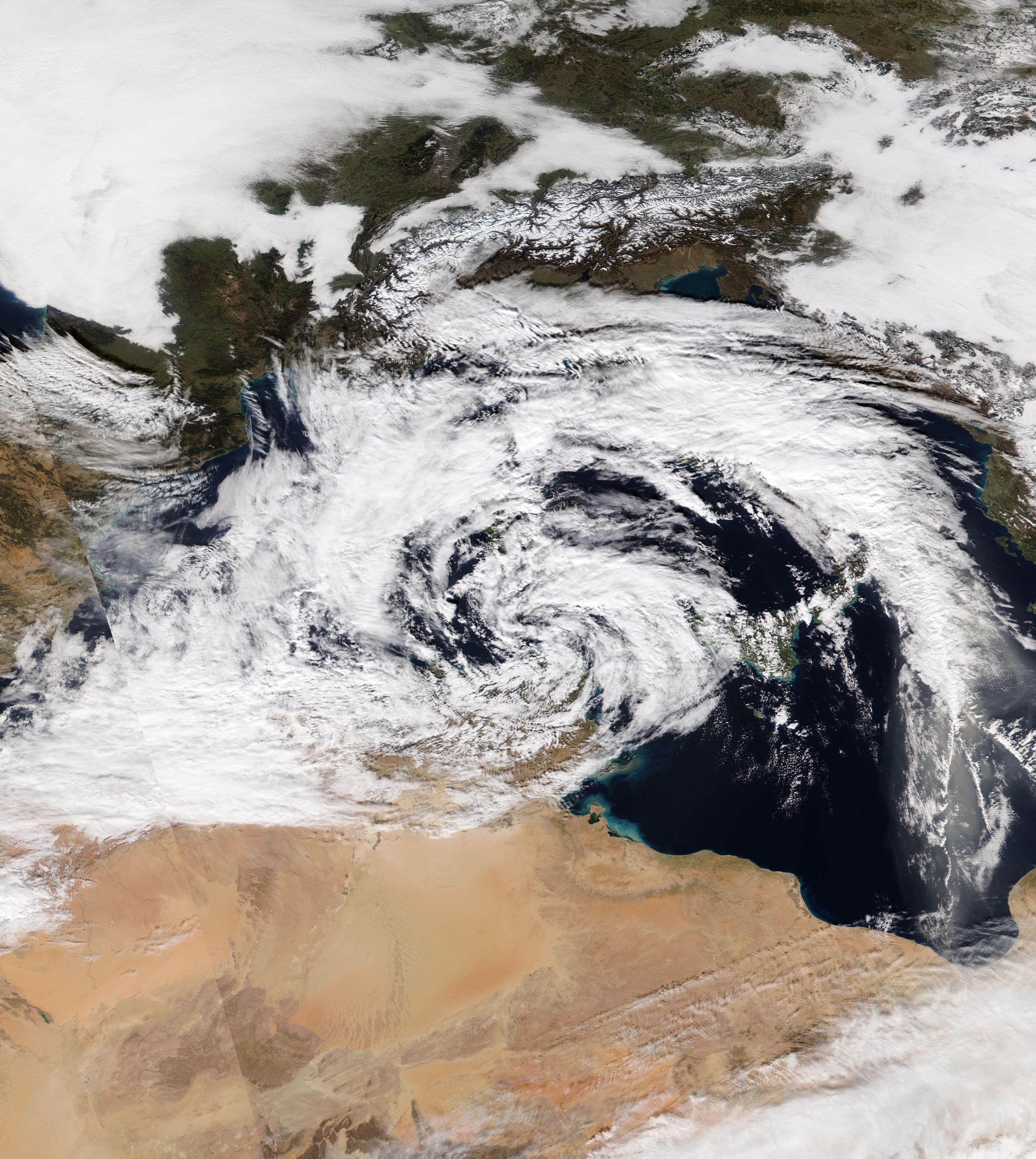

- Area affected: Italy, Tunisia, Algeria
- Date of impact: 16–19 January 2025
- Maximum wind gust: Unspecified
- Lowest pressure: 1,006 hPa (29.71 inHg)
- Fatalities: Unspecified
- Power outages: Unspecified

Storm Gabri was named by the Italian Servizio Meteorologico on 16 January 2025.

The Italian Servizio Meteorologico, issued red wind and rain warnings for Storm Gabri. This included the region of Calabria and the islands of Sardinia and Sicily.

Strong winds were expected to impact Friuli-Venezia Giulia and Veneto, and Liguria and Tuscany for a slightly longer period of time. The arrival of Storm Gabri was anticipated to bring intense and abundant precipitation to Calabria, Sicily, and eastern Sardinia, including heavy rain, showers, and thunderstorms. These thunderstorms were likely to be accompanied by frequent lightning, local hailstorms, and strong wind gusts. Storm winds from the east were forecast to affect Calabria, Sicily, and Sardinia for the next day, with strong storm-force winds expected in Basilicata and Campania during the same period. The Sardinia Channel, the Southern Tyrrhenian Sea, and the Southern Ionian Sea were expected to experience very rough to gravely rough sea conditions with surges along exposed coasts starting tomorrow morning.

Level 1 heavy rain and thunderstorm warnings were issued for eastern and northern parts of Tunisia with impacts expected. Whilst, Algeria issued a red level 3 rain warning for northern areas of the country just east of Algiers, which is in an orange level 2 warning for rain.

=== Storm Garoe ===
Storm Garoe
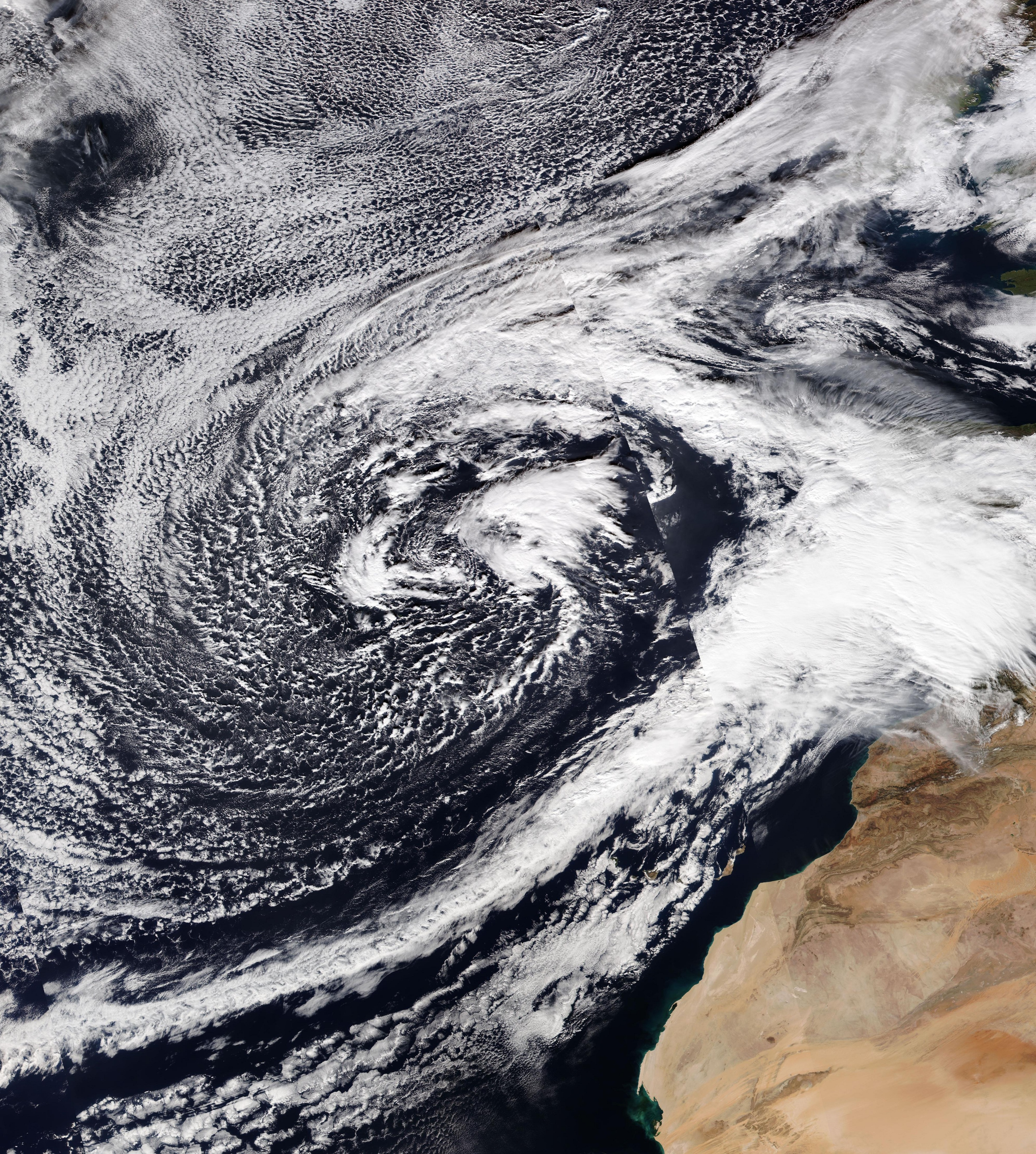
- Area affected: Azores Archipelago, Madeira Archipelago, Portugal, Spain
- Date of impact: 17–23 January 2025
- Maximum wind gust: Unspecified
- Lowest pressure: 984 hPa (29.06 inHg)
- Fatalities: Unspecified
- Power outages: Unspecified

Storm Garoe was named by Portuguese Institute of the Sea and Atmosphere (IPMA) on 17 January 2025.

The Portuguese Institute of the Sea and Atmosphere issued orange wind and coastal event warnings for the Azores Archipelago Ocidental G and Central parts. With yellow rain warnings issued too. Whilst for the Madeira Archipelago, orange coastal event warnings, yellow rain and wind warnings were issued. For mainland Portugal yellow rain warnings were issued for the following regions: Leiria, Lisbon, Portalegre, Porto, Santarém, Setúbal, Viana do Castelo, Castelo Branco, Évora, Faro, Aveiro, Beja and Braga.

Spain also issued weather warnings for Storm Garoe. These included orange rain warnings for the far south-west of the country which was surrounded by a yellow warning for heavy rain. In the orange area AEMET forecasted up to 80 mm of rainfall in 12 hours, with up to 180 throughout 24 hours, which could cause flooding.

A destructive tornado associated with this storm tore through a community on the coast of Portugal, and many waterspouts were observed off the coast of Spain and Portugal.

=== Storm Éowyn (Gilles) ===
Storm Éowyn
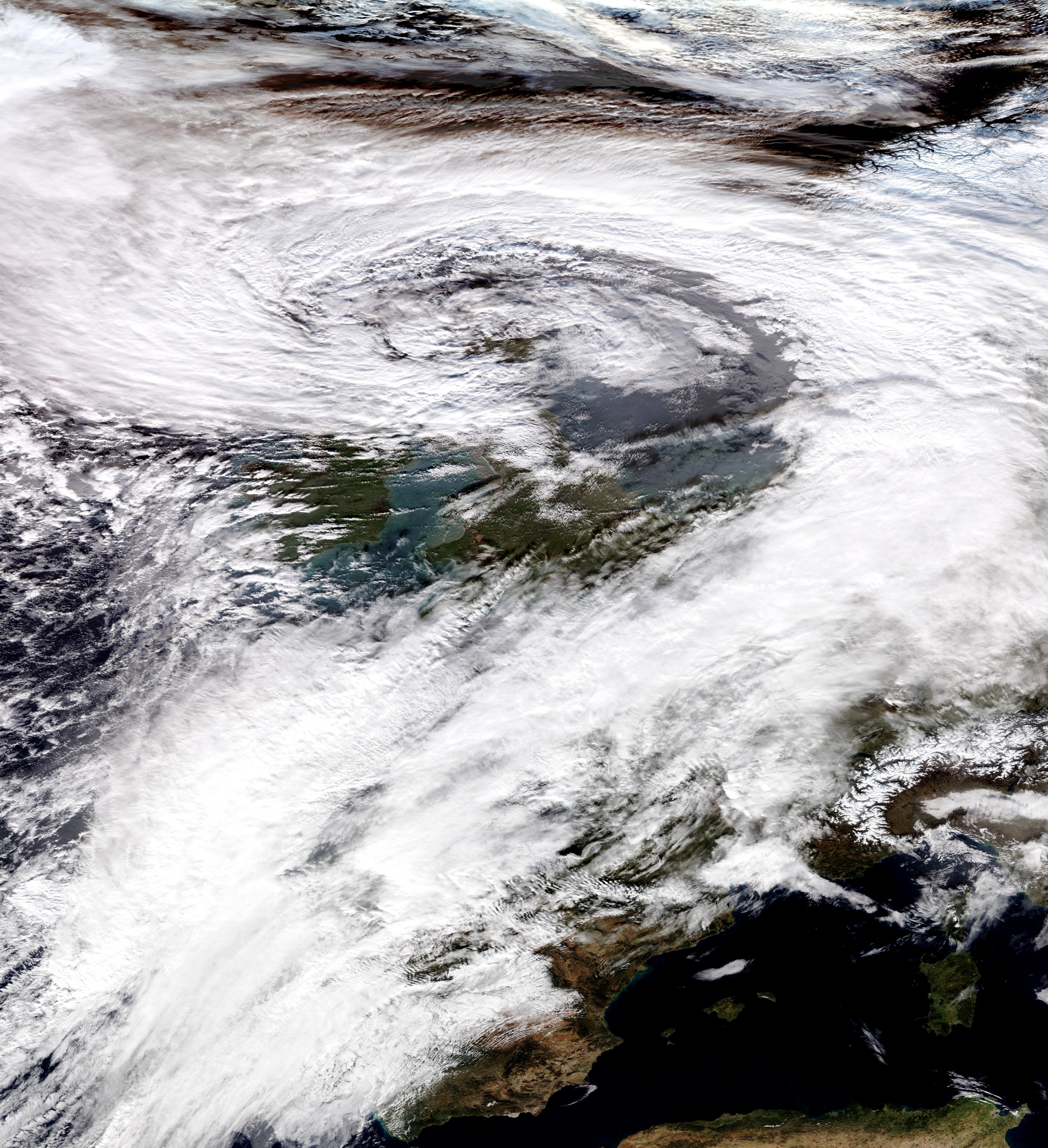
- Storm Éowyn as it approached Ireland on 24 January 2025, at 08:00 UTC

- Area affected: United Kingdom, Isle of Man, Ireland, Netherlands, Norway
- Date of impact: 21–27 January 2025
- Maximum wind gust: 135 mph (217 km/h) at Cairngorm, Scotland
- Lowest pressure: 939 hPa (27.73 inHg)
- Fatalities: 3
- Power outages: 1,106,000 (1,000,000 in Ireland, 106,000 in Scotland)

Storm Éowyn was named by the UK's Met Office on 21 January 2025, forming from the remnants of the US Gulf Coast blizzard. A day later it was named Gilles by the Free University of Berlin.

Widespread amber and red weather warnings were issued across Ireland and the United Kingdom ahead of the arrival of Éowyn. By the end of 22 January, the entirety of Ireland was covered by a red wind warning, with Northern Ireland, northern England, north Wales and southern Scotland under an amber wind warning. The Met Office have also issued rain and snow warnings across the United Kingdom, warning of potential blizzard conditions at times. Within the red warning area across Northern Ireland and southern Scotland, peak gusts of 80–90 mph (130–140 km/h) fairly widely were expected with perhaps up to 100 mph (160 km/h) along some exposed coasts. Within the amber warning area, winds were expected with peak gusts of 60–70 mph (97–113 km/h) fairly widely inland, 70–80 mph (110–130 km/h) in some areas, and 80–90 mph (130–140 km/h) along more exposed coasts and hills.

Elsewhere, in France, Meteo France issued yellow wind warnings for northern parts of the country around the English Channel, with a yellow rain warning for western parts of the north coast. Winds in these areas were expected to peak between 40 and 60 km/h (25 and 37 mph) inland, and up to 70–80 km/h (43–50 mph), locally 90 km/h (56 mph) on the Channel coasts.

On 23 January 2025, a severe emergency alert was sent to mobile devices across Northern Ireland at 17:25 UTC and in parts of Scotland at 17:50 UTC. The alert was broadcast to around 4.5 million devices making it the largest scale use of the UK's emergency alert system since its introduction in April 2023.

Additional areas likely to be affected include Tayside and Fife, Grampian, Highlands and Eilean Siar, Northern Ireland, Orkney and Shetland, southwest Scotland, Lothian Borders, and Strathclyde. A further yellow wind warning has been issued for parts of northern England and Scotland on Saturday. A yellow snow warning was issued for central and northern Scotland where outbreaks of rain spreading north-eastward on Friday morning will fall as snow initially, especially on hills, before reverting to rain and eventually easing. Any accumulations across northern England and southern Scotland will be fairly short-lived and largely on hills, where 2–5 centimetres may accumulate in places above 100 m elevation and 5–10 cm above 300 m. Snow will probably persist for longer north of the Central Belt, where as much as 15–25 cm is possible above 300 m. Given the strong winds that will accompany the snow, temporary blizzard conditions are possible over higher ground, with some drifting also possible for a time, this probably more likely north of the Central Belt of Scotland.

In Norway a yellow wind warning was issued for Western Norway.

On 24 January at around 5:00 a.m., a wind gust provisionally measured at 114 mph (183 km/h) was recorded at Mace Head in Connemara in County Galway, which would surpass Ireland's highest measured wind gust of 113 mph (182 km/h) at Foynes in 1945. Moneypoint weather station measured a 37.158 mph (59.800 km/h) wind gust 4:10 a.m. The intensity of winds at Ceann Mhása, Belmullet, and Markree caused data interruption to local weather instruments. A mean sustained wind speed of 135 km/h was measured at Mace Head in Galway at around 4:00 a.m., surpassing the prior Irish record of 131 km/h set in 1945 at Foynes.

A maximum wave height of 10.4 metres was measured by the Finnis Buoy, off the west coast of Ireland near Doolin.

All flights from 8 a.m. to 2 p.m. at Ireland West Airport were cancelled. Several flights at Dublin Airport and Shannon Airport were cancelled or delayed. Aer Arann and Aran Island Ferries announced the closure of all morning services.

In the morning of 23 January, a strong tornado tore through villages in Cornwall.

At 9 a.m., 815,000 houses and businesses were suffering from power outages, particularly in Mayo and Galway and 115,000 homes, mainly in Munster, were without water. Several instances of downed trees in both counties and in Munster were also reported. Several families in Munster required evacuation after their houses or caravans were destroyed or severely damaged by strong winds, with many cases involving roofs being blown off. A dozen alarm activations were reported across Munster. At least six to seven downed trees were reported on the N4 road near Newtown Forbes, blocking the village off from both ends. Most roads in Longford had trees fall on them. The Connacht GAA Airdome in Co. Mayo was completely destroyed.

A car collided with a downed tree in north Dublin.

All travel to and from the Isle of Man was suspended, including ferries between Douglas and Heysham operated by the Isle of Man Steam Packet Company, as well as Bus Vannin services. Closures include the Isle of Man Airport, the Snaefell mountain road, and schools and government offices. Around 100 homes lost power.

On 23 January, Devon and Cornwall Police said that one person was injured at Holywell Bay, near Newquay, where there had been "caravans blowing".

As of 9 a.m., over 93,000 homes and business were without power in Northern Ireland. There were widespread power cuts across Wales. Places affected were Ysbyty Gwynedd hospital in Bangor and the communities of Bethesda, Tregarth, Llanbedr, Blaenau Ffestiniog and Menai Bridge on Anglesey.

=== Storm Herminia (Ivo) ===
Storm Herminia
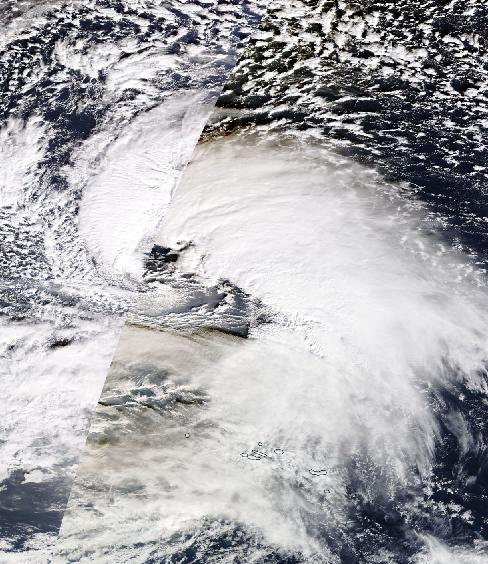
- Area affected: United Kingdom, Ireland, Spain, Portugal, France
- Date of impact: 24–30 January 2025
- Maximum wind gust: 83 mph (134 km/h) at Berry Head
- Lowest pressure: 948 hPa (27.99 inHg)
- Fatalities: Unspecified
- Power outages: Unspecified

Storm Herminia was named by the Spain's AEMET and Ivo by Free University of Berlin on 24 January 2025.

Warnings for wind were issued for north-western Spain for predicted windspeeds of 70–90 km/h (43 mph (69 km/h)-56 mph (90 km/h)) within a yellow warning area. However, in an orange wind warning issued by AEMET, windspeeds were anticipated to reach up to 100 km/h (62 mph (100 km/h)). Meanwhile, yellow warnings for rainfall were also issued for north-western Spain on the north Portuguese border, with rainfall amounts of 60 mm in 12 hours and up to 100 mm in 24 hours. In Portugal, northern regions were under yellow rain and wind warnings as a result of the system.

The Met Office issued a yellow wind warning for Sunday 26 January for the expected arrival of the strong winds from Storm Herminia. Winds are likely to gust 50 to 60 mph quite widely, and around some exposed coasts and hills gusts to 70 mph are possible. This warning covered South West England, Wales, western England, south-west Scotland and Northern Ireland, with the latter two areas being severely impacted by Storm Éowyn a couple of days earlier. The Met Office also issued a yellow rain warning accompanying the wind warning, this warning covered the south-west of England, Wales, the Midlands the south and parts of the south-east of England, as well as the London area. Expected totals were expected to be around 10–20 mm, with locally nearer 30–50 mm over high ground, particularly over exposed south or southeast-facing upslopes. It is then possible that a further spell of heavy rain may develop and affect parts of England and Wales on Sunday evening, clearing early Monday and should this be the case a few places may see as much as 80 mm of rainfall in total.

Ferry services between the Isle of Wight and Southampton were suspended until further notice due to Storm Herminia, with strong winds having brought power cuts across the south-west of England as the storm closed in on the UK on Sunday. Berry Head, in Devon, recorded gusts of 83 mph (134 km/h) from Herminia, while power cuts were reported by thousands in Devon. More than 4,500 properties were without power in Devon and Cornwall as of 4pm 26 January 2025. National Grid said 2,968 properties have been hit in Cornwall, with another 1,488 in Devon. National Rail said flooding between Par and Newquay has blocked the Atlantic Coast Line and trains running between the two stations have been cancelled. A Ryanair flight that was expected to land at Newquay Airport at 07:35 GMT was diverted to London Gatwick.

=== Storm Ivo (Julian) ===
Storm Ivo
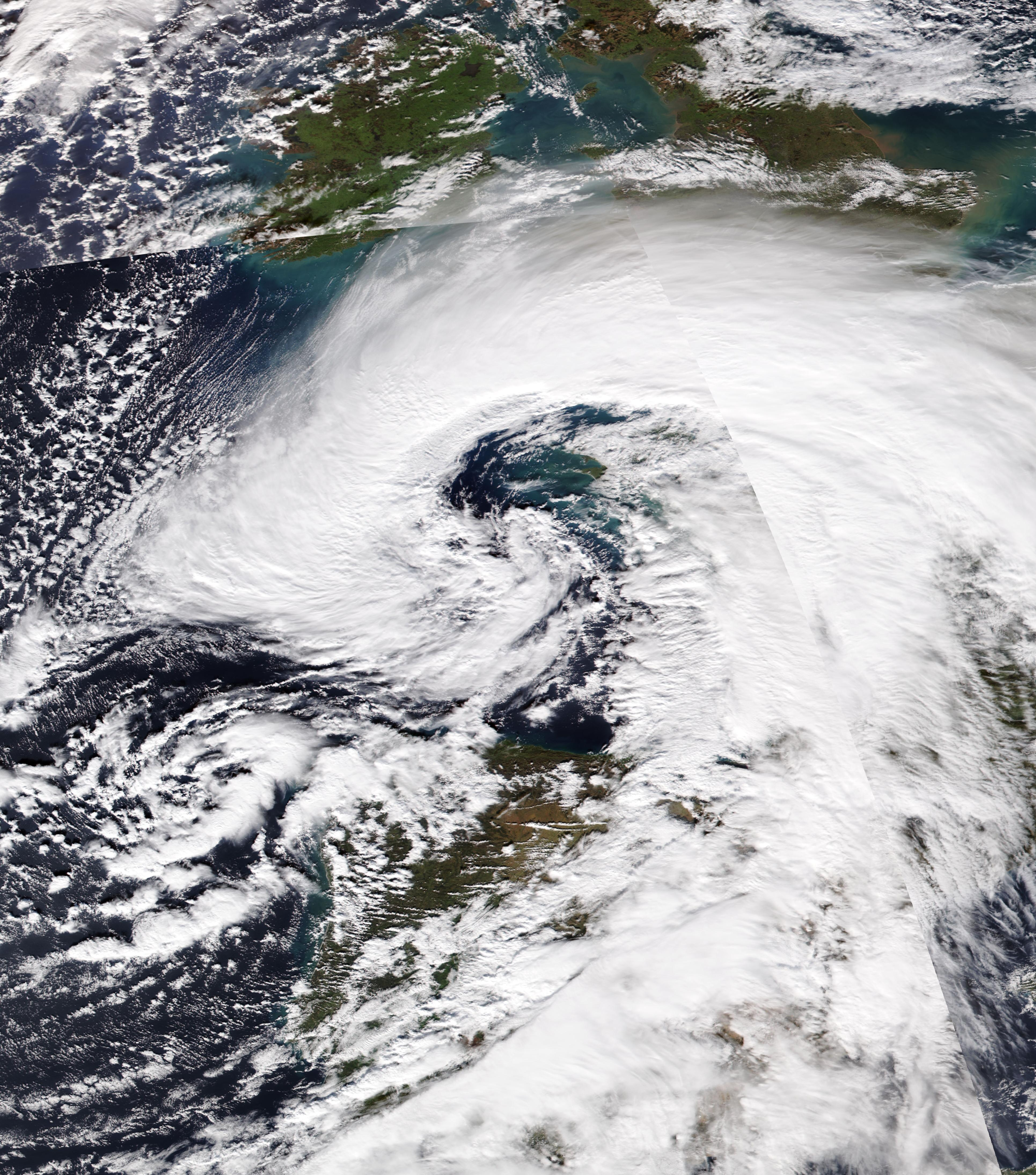
- Area affected: United Kingdom, Spain, Portugal, France
- Date of impact: 27–31 January 2025
- Fatalities: Unspecified
- Power outages: Unspecified

Storm Ivo was named by IPMA and Julian by Free University of Berlin on 27 January 2025.

Red warnings for coastal events and orange and yellow warnings for wind were in force for western parts of Portugal, with waves having measured 7 to 8 metres, reaching a maximum height of 15 metres, with wind gusts upwards of 62 mph (100 km/h) being anticipated.

Similar warnings were issued by Meteo France with yellow warnings for wind for the south-western part of the country and yellow warnings for rain in the northern part of the country. Red and orange severe flood warnings were also issued for north-western France due to heavy rain that fell on 29 January 2025. Also, whilst the United Kingdom experienced heavy rainfall along the south-coast, no warnings were issued. However, the Channel Islands were under an orange wind warning, issued by Jersey Met.

=== Storm Coral ===
Storm Coral
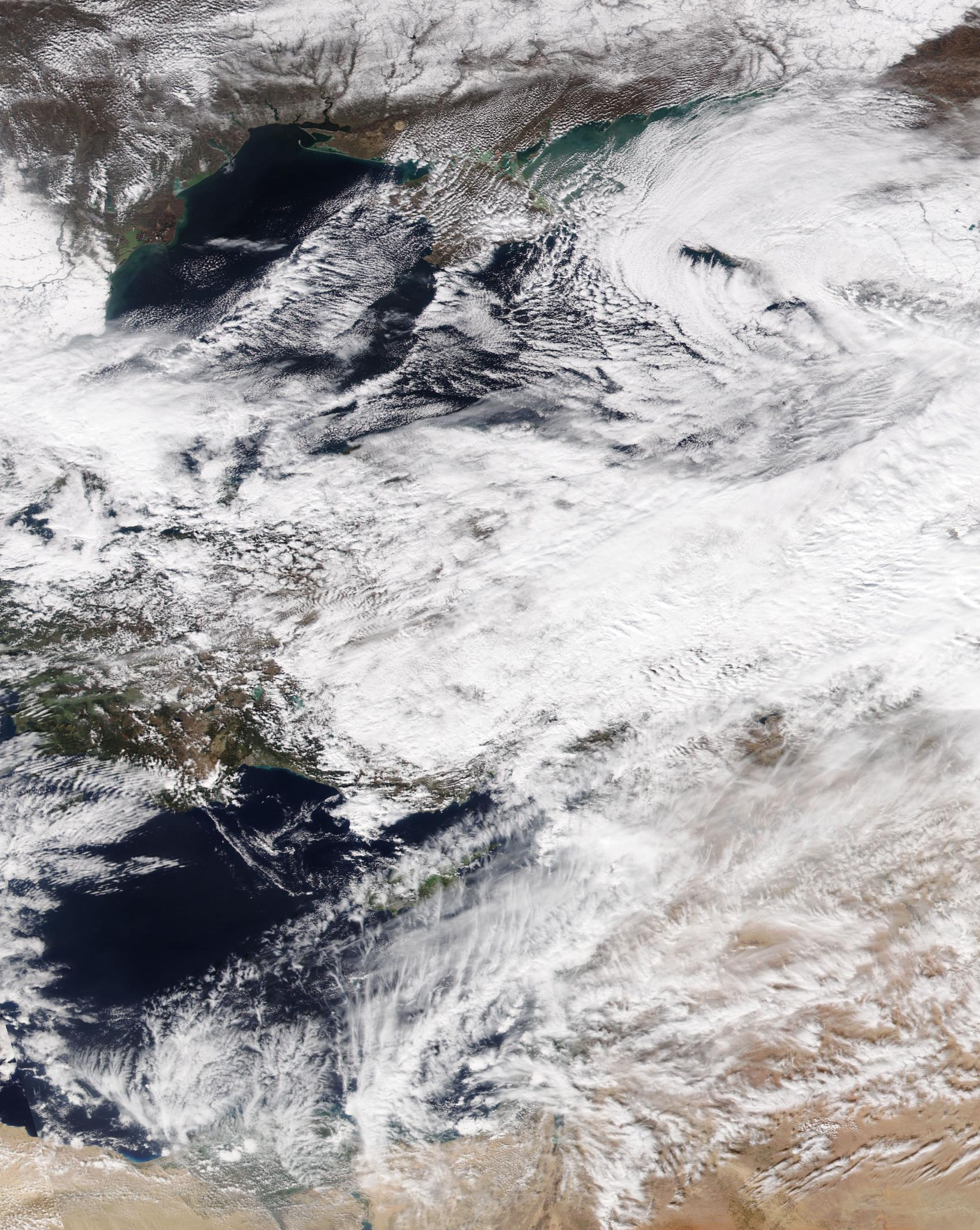
- Area affected: Cyprus, Israel, Turkey, Greece
- Date of impact: 18–25 February 2025
- Fatalities: Unspecified
- Power outages: Unspecified

Storm Coral was named by Israel Meteorological Service on 18 February 2025.

Israel Meteorological Service said that the storm system had been set to impact the country from that weekend into early next week (22 February through 24 February). Storm Coral had been expected to deliver an unusually cold Arctic air, resulting in snowfall across the region. Snow had initially affected the northern mountains on Saturday, then spread to lower elevations, including the central regions, Jerusalem, and the Hebron Hills, by Sunday. Snowfall was possible above 1,640–2,297 feet.

Greece had experienced rare snowfall, even in Athens, with ski resorts having anticipated a long season. Cyprus faced snow in mountainous regions and potential power shortages, even Istanbul saw early snowfall, which was a rare event for the city. On 25 February 2025, the storm dissipated.

=== Storm Jana ===
Storm Jana
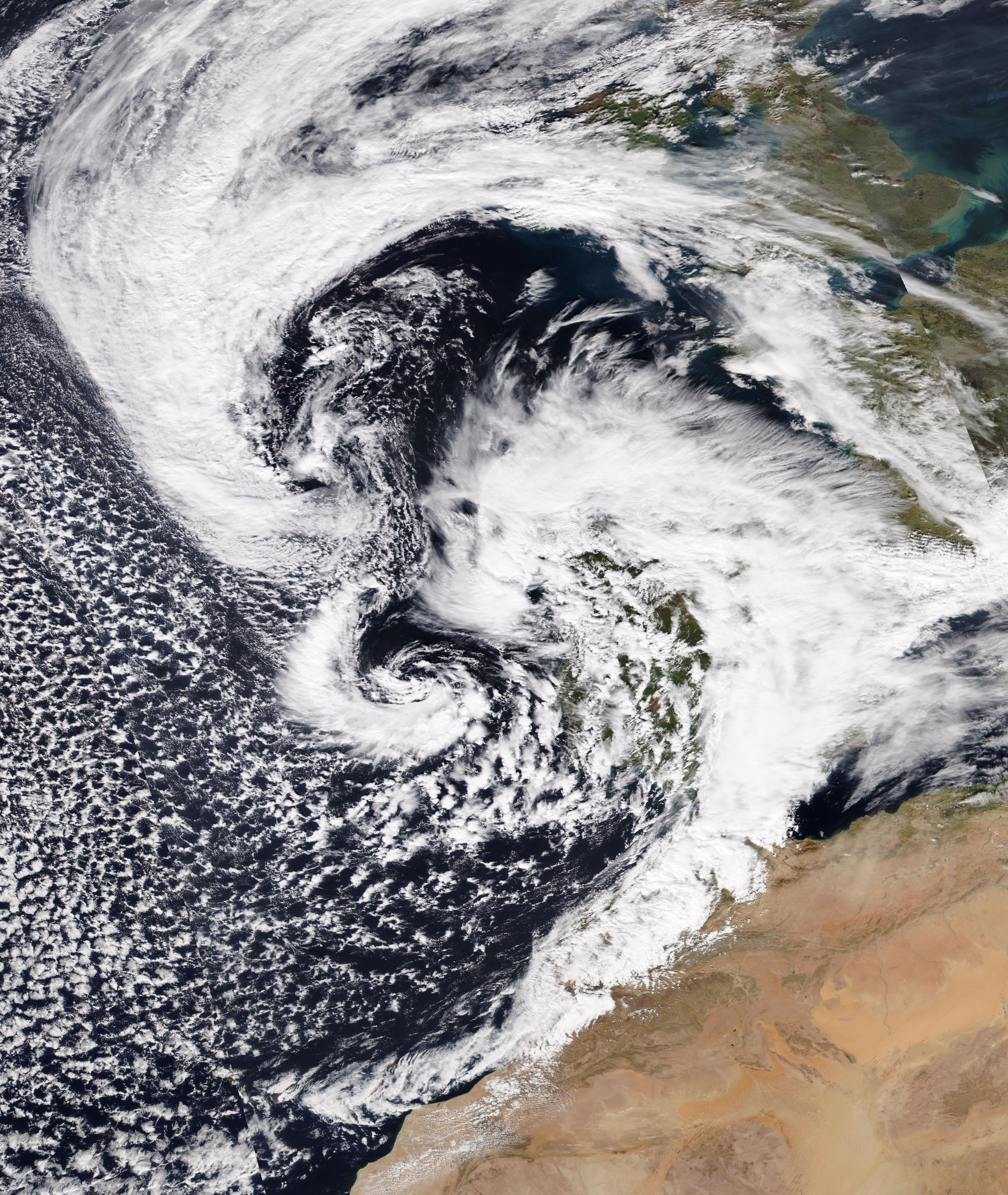
- Area affected: Portugal, Spain
- Date of impact: 6–12 March 2025
- Fatalities: Unspecified
- Power outages: Unspecified

Storm Jana was named on 6 March 2025 by the Spanish AEMET.

Orange warnings for rain were in force for south-west Spain, areas near Seville and central areas of Spain. A yellow wind and rain warning surrounded these areas, as well as one in the north of the country. There were also yellow rain warnings in force for central and northern parts of Portugal.

=== Storm Konrad ===
Storm Konrad
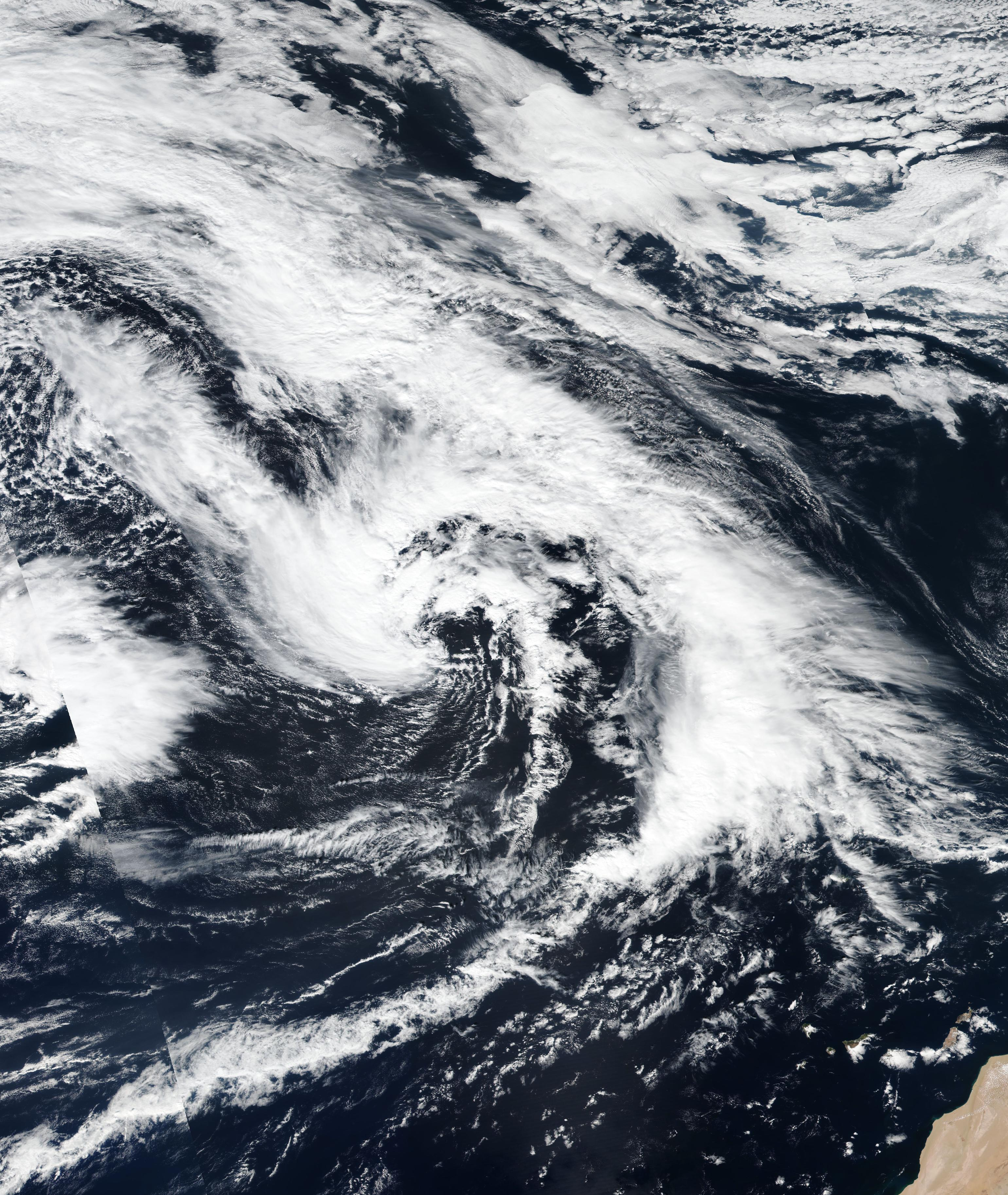
- Area affected: Azores Archipelago, Madeira Archipelago, Portugal
- Date of impact: 10–14 March 2025
- Fatalities: Unspecified
- Power outages: Unspecified

Storm Konrad was named on 10 March 2025, by the Portuguese IPMA.

IPMA issued orange warnings for the Azores and Madeira Archipelagos for wind and coastal events as well as yellow warnings for rain and wind in the wider area. Some yellow wind and rain warnings where issued for mainland Portugal too with disruption anticipated.

=== Storm Laurence ===
Storm Laurence
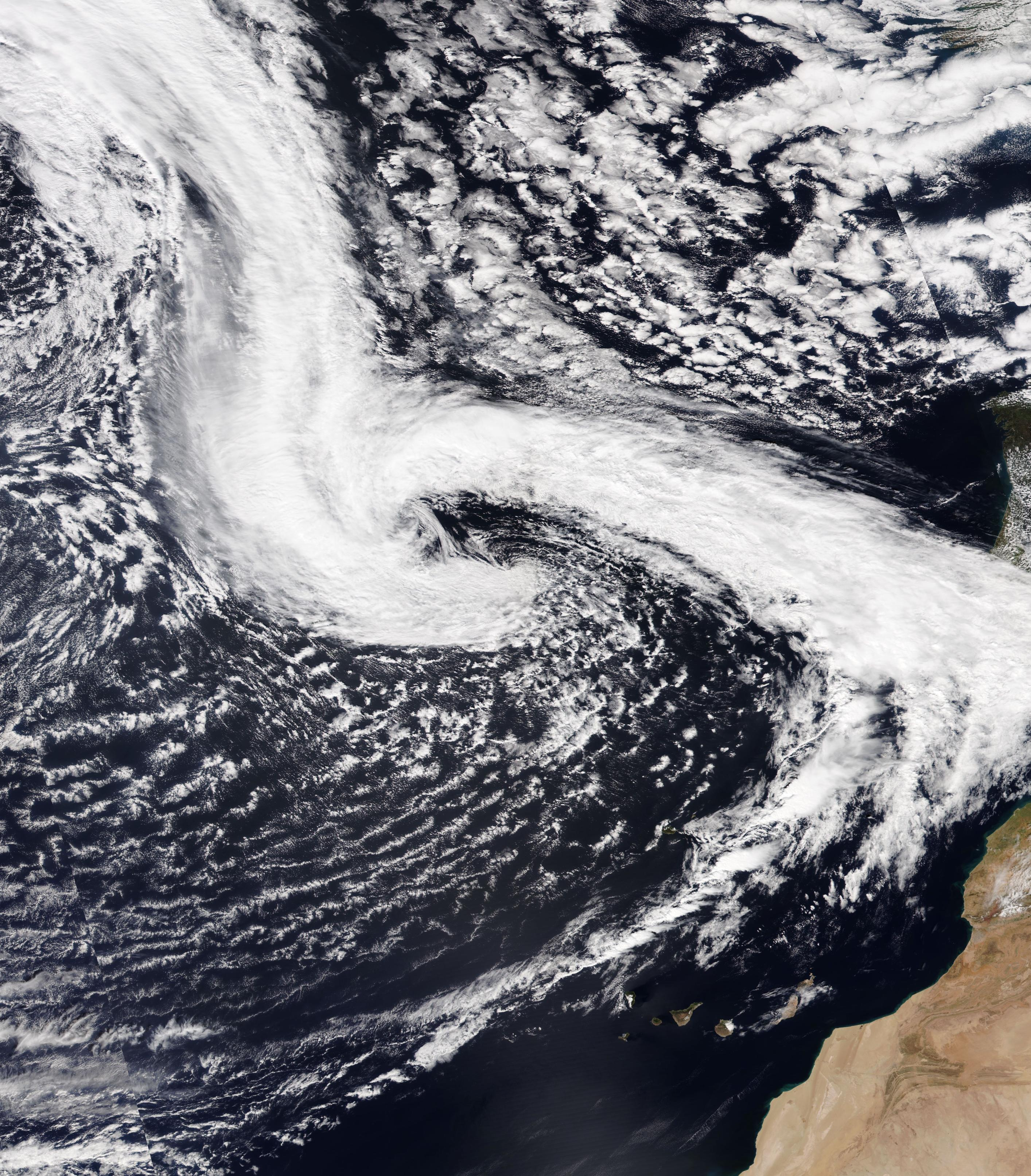
- Area affected: Azores Archipelago, Portugal, Spain
- Date of impact: 14–18 March 2025
- Fatalities: 3
- Power outages: Unspecified

Storm Laurence was named on 14 March 2025 by the IPMA.

The IPMA had issued orange warnings for rain and yellow warnings for wind for most of the Azores, with mainland Portugal already having yellow warnings for rain and wind. Spain also had yellow rain warnings for the south-west of the country.

This storm spawned three tornadoes in Andalusia.

=== Storm Martinho (Volker) ===
Storm Martinho
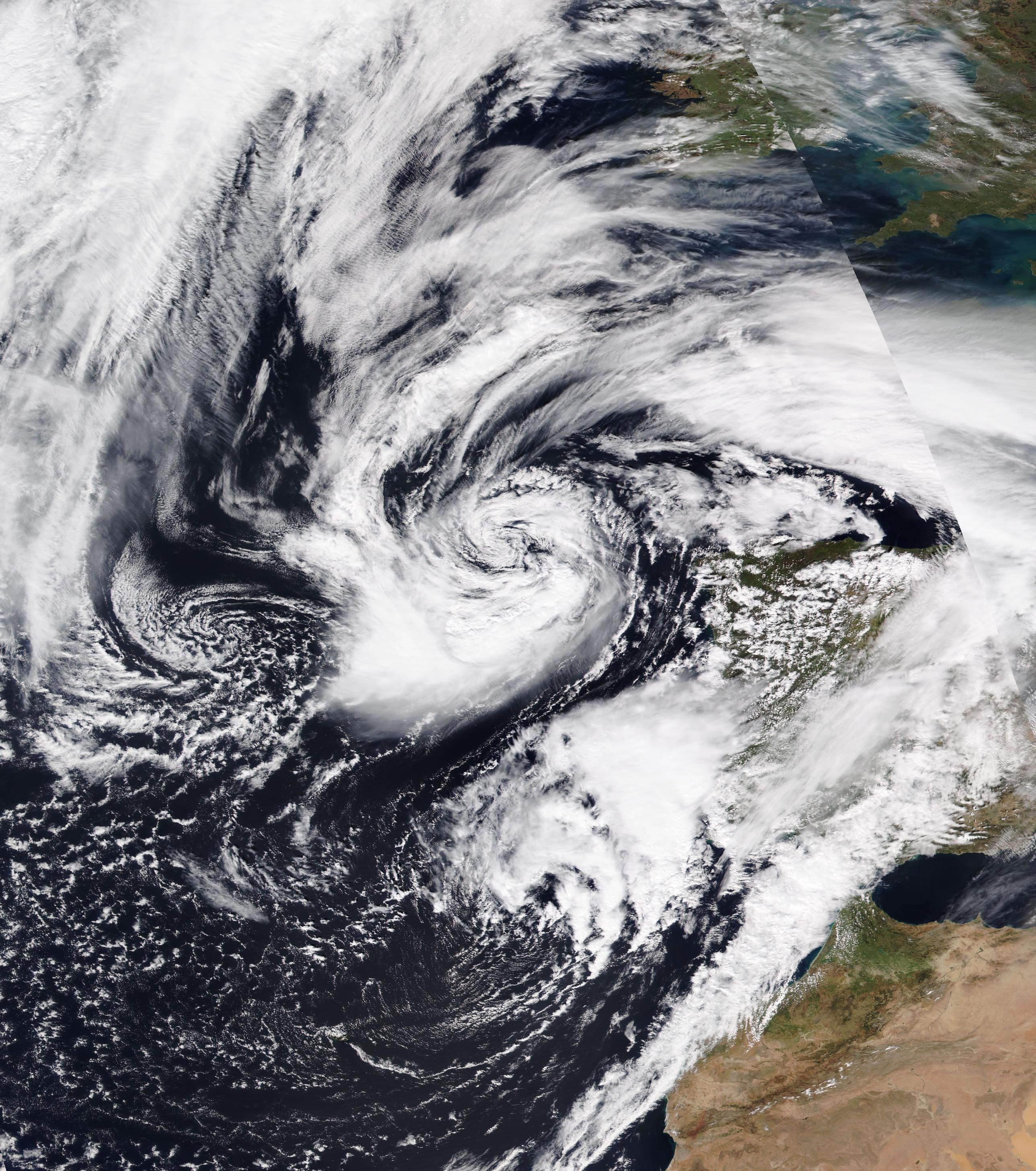
- Area affected: Portugal, Spain
- Date of impact: 18–22 March 2025
- Fatalities: Unspecified
- Power outages: Unspecified

Storm Martinho was named on 18 March 2025, by the Portuguese IPMA. and Volker by Free University of Berlin a day later.

Storm Martinho caused widespread damage and flooding across Spain. Madrid experienced record rainfall, prompting flood warnings along the River Manzanares. Galicia suffered over 400 incidents of wind damage, and Andalusia's coastal towns endured significant property damage from powerful gusts.

In Portugal, electricity produced by wind power in Portugal hit an all-time high, fuelled by the strong winds of Storm Martinho. Also, high winds from the storm tore off part of the roof at Bernardim Ribeiro Primary School in Odivelas, forcing its closure and disrupting the education of 200 students.

Although the storm did not directly impact the United Kingdom or France, the system brought unseasonably high temperatures and thunderstorms for western Europe.

=== Storm Nuria ===
Storm Nuria
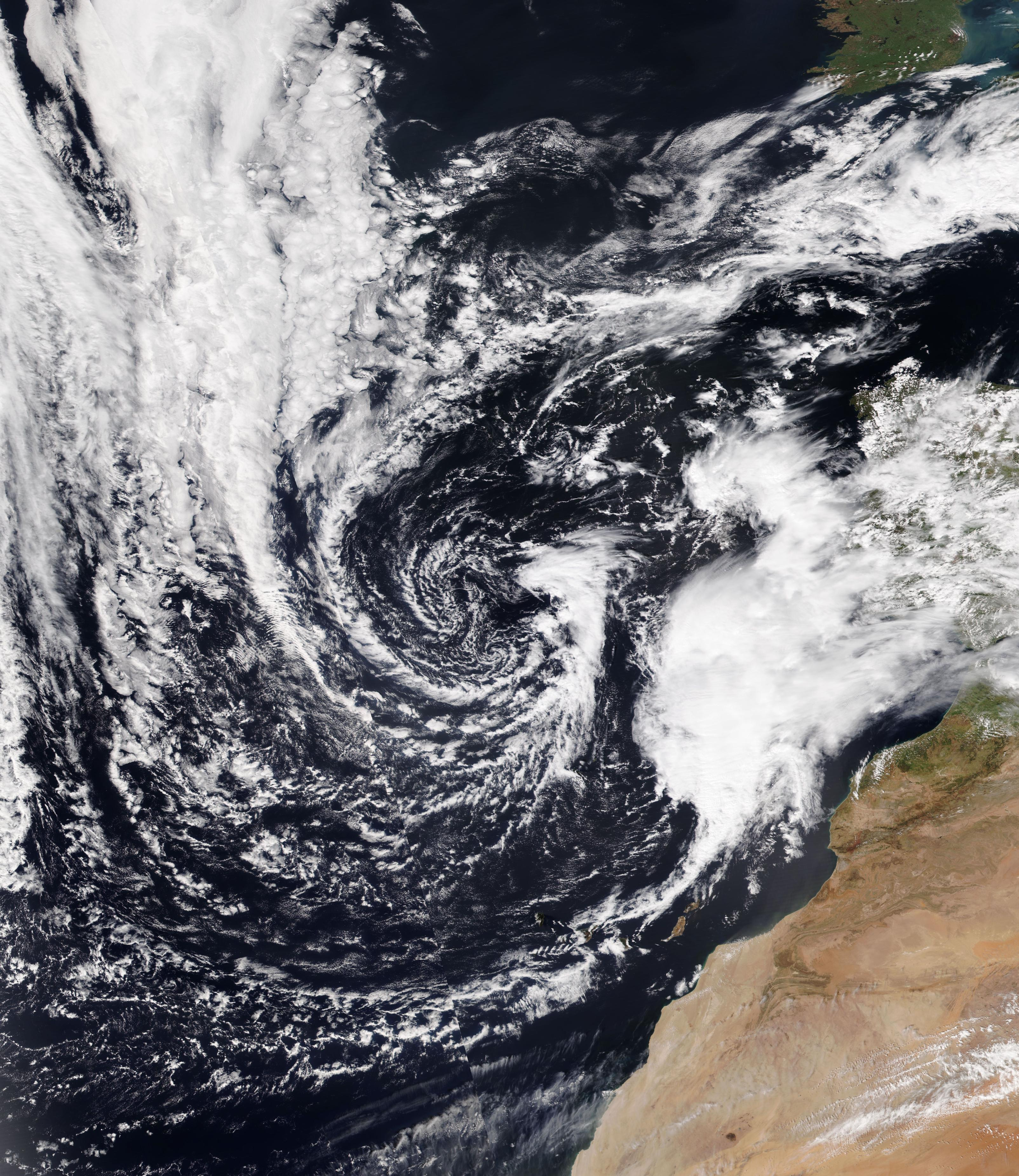
- Area affected: Portugal, Canary Islands, Spain
- Date of impact: 1–5 April 2025
- Maximum wind gust: 77 mph (124 km/h) at Teide National Park
- Fatalities: 3+
- Power outages: Unspecified

Storm Nuria was named on 1 April 2025 by Spain's AEMET.

The storm brought hurricane-force winds to part of the Canary Islands with red weather warnings being issued. The storm triggered over 300 emergency calls and led to the cancellation of 45 flights there. Wind speeds reached 124 km/h in Teide National Park, 119 km/h in Vallehermoso (La Gomera), and exceeded 100 km/h in several other locations, including El Hierro and La Palma. Two people sustained injuries during the storm. A 72-year-old man in Puerto de la Cruz suffered a leg injury after being struck by a sheet of metal, while another man was treated in Agaete, Gran Canaria, after glass shattered at a bus stop shelter.

The storm spawned a tornado in Coria del Río, Spain, killing three people when an agricultural warehouse collapsed. Another IF1 tornado injured 4 workers at a greenhouse.

=== Storm Olivier ===
Storm Olivier
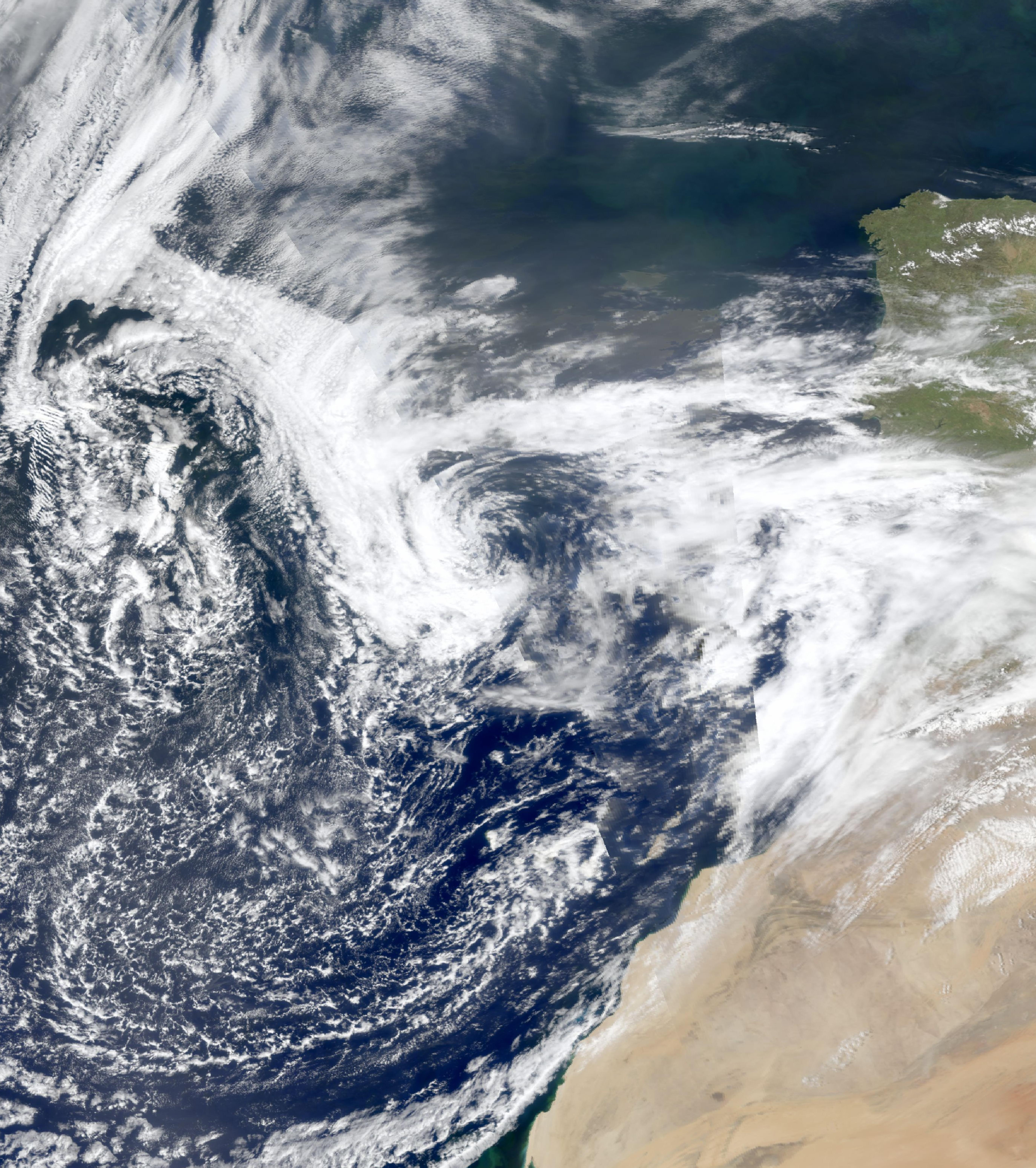
- Area affected: Canary Islands, Spain, Morocco
- Date of impact: 7–13 April 2025
- Fatalities: Unspecified
- Power outages: Unspecified

Storm Olivier was named on 7 April 2025 by Spain's AEMET.

The Canary Islands were anticipated to experience potential for very strong winds, particularly in the western islands. The strong easterly sea storm affecting the entire coastline of the province of Málaga is described as the most damaging for beaches. A yellow warning for strong gusts of wind has been activated in the province of Málaga, with winds reaching 50 to 60 km/h (30 to 40 mph) and waves of three metres expected on the coast. Storm Olivier is expected to bring rainfall throughout the Andalusia region until Easter Tuesday, potentially causing disruption. Also, northern areas of Morocco were expected to see showers this week and through the weekend.

=== Storm Darius ===
Storm Darius
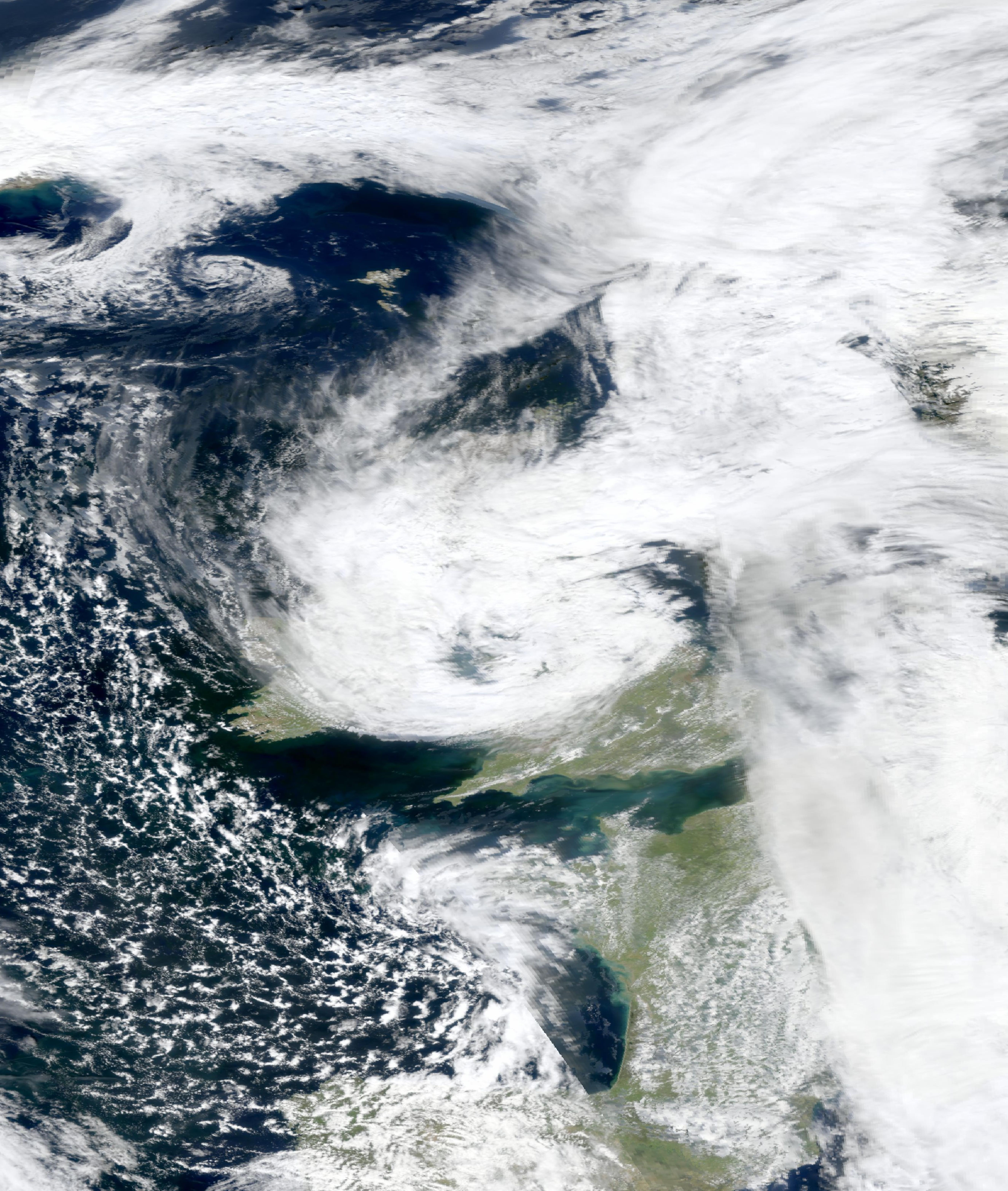
- Area affected: Spain, France, United Kingdom, Ireland
- Date of impact: 14–18 April 2025
- Fatalities: Unspecified
- Power outages: Unspecified

Storm Darius was named on 14 April 2025 by Free University of Berlin.

The storm was expected to cause flooding in parts of western Europe, particularly the United Kingdom, and Spain.

Spain issued yellow wind warnings for north-western provinces, with the Met Office in the United Kingdom issuing yellow warnings for rainfall, across the south-west and Wales and eastern Northern Ireland. The Met Office said, A spell of heavy and persistent rain is expected to move north across western Britain during Tuesday into early Wednesday. Whilst there is some uncertainty in where the heaviest rain will fall, 20–40 mm of rain is expected fairly widely. A few places may see 50–75 mm of rain during this period. Meteo France also issued yellow wind warnings for north-western parts of the country. Met Éireann issued a yellow Rain warning for Dublin, Louth, Meath, Wexford, Wicklow.

=== Storm Hans ===
Storm Hans
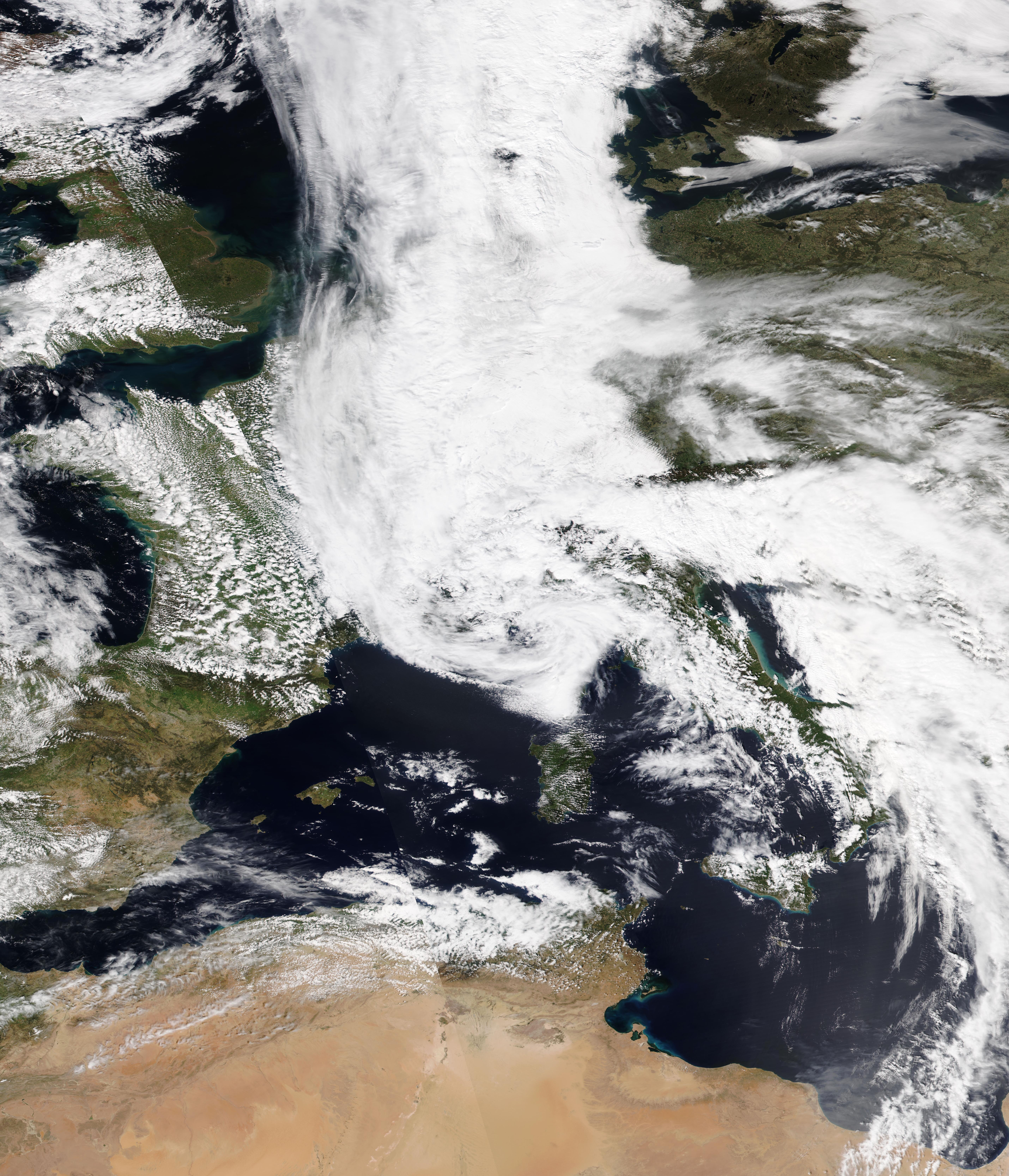
- Area affected: Italy, Switzerland, France
- Date of impact: 15–18 April 2025
- Fatalities: 4
- Power outages: Unspecified

Storm Hans was named on 15 April 2025, by the Italian Servizio Meteorologico.

Heavy rain was a concern, particularly in northern Italy, where over 200mm may fall by Thursday, giving a risk of flash flooding and landslides. The Italian weather agency METEO issued a severe weather warning starting at 12 pm on Monday, 14 April. This warning indicates intense and abundant rainfall for the Veneto and Friuli-Venezia Giulia regions, and storms are expected over Tuscany, Lazio, and Northern Campania. Starting on Tuesday evening, 15 April, heavy rainfall and thunderstorms are forecast for approximately 12 to 18 hours in Central-Northern Piedmont, while Liguria can expect these conditions to last longer, for about 24 to 26 hours. A red rain warning was issued for Piemonte as a result of the weather.

In Switzerland, Meteo Swiss issued a level 5 red rain warnings were issued for south-western parts of the country where 80–150 mm of rain was expected. These were surrounded by orange alerts for rain.

At least 4 deaths has been reported in France and Italy.

=== Storm Ines ===
Storm Ines
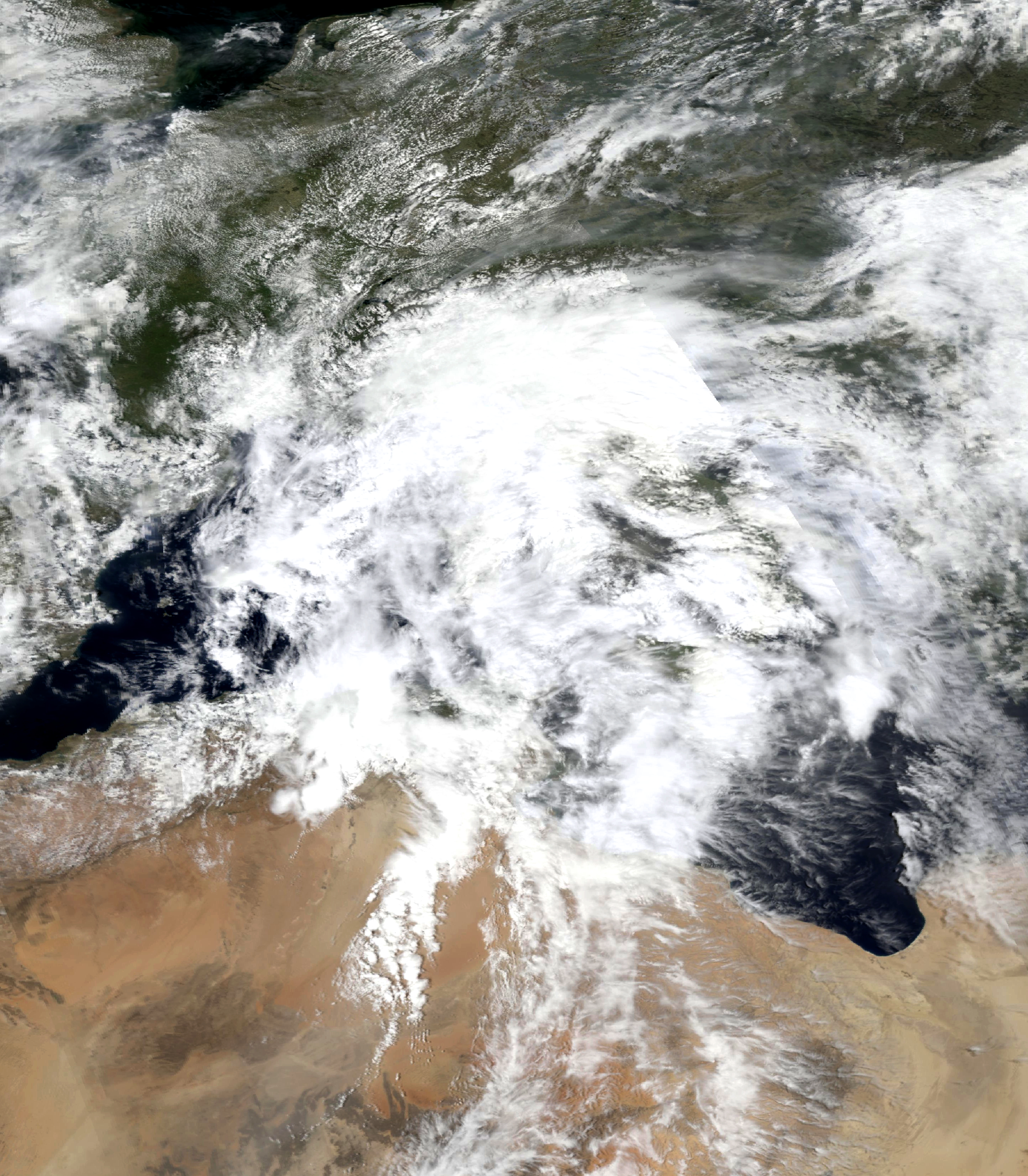
- Area affected: Italy, Croatia, Slovenia, Bosnia and Herzegovina, Serbia, Greece, Tunisia, Algeria
- Date of impact: 14–17 May 2025
- Fatalities: Unspecified
- Power outages: Unspecified

Storm Ines was named on 14 May 2025 by the Italian Servizio Meteorologico.

Ines was forecast to bring intense rainfall and severe thunderstorms. Rainfall totals may reach around 60 mm, with some areas, such as Sicily, Calabria, Apulia, and northwestern Greece, potentially seeing over 100 mm. This significantly increases the risk of flash flooding. Thunderstorms may also bring brief periods of strong wind gusts. Ines affected northwestern Africa. Northern Algeria was hit by severe thunderstorms that, according to the European Severe Weather Database, produced hailstones up to 2.5 cm in diameter.

=== Storm Floris (Ning) ===
Storm Floris
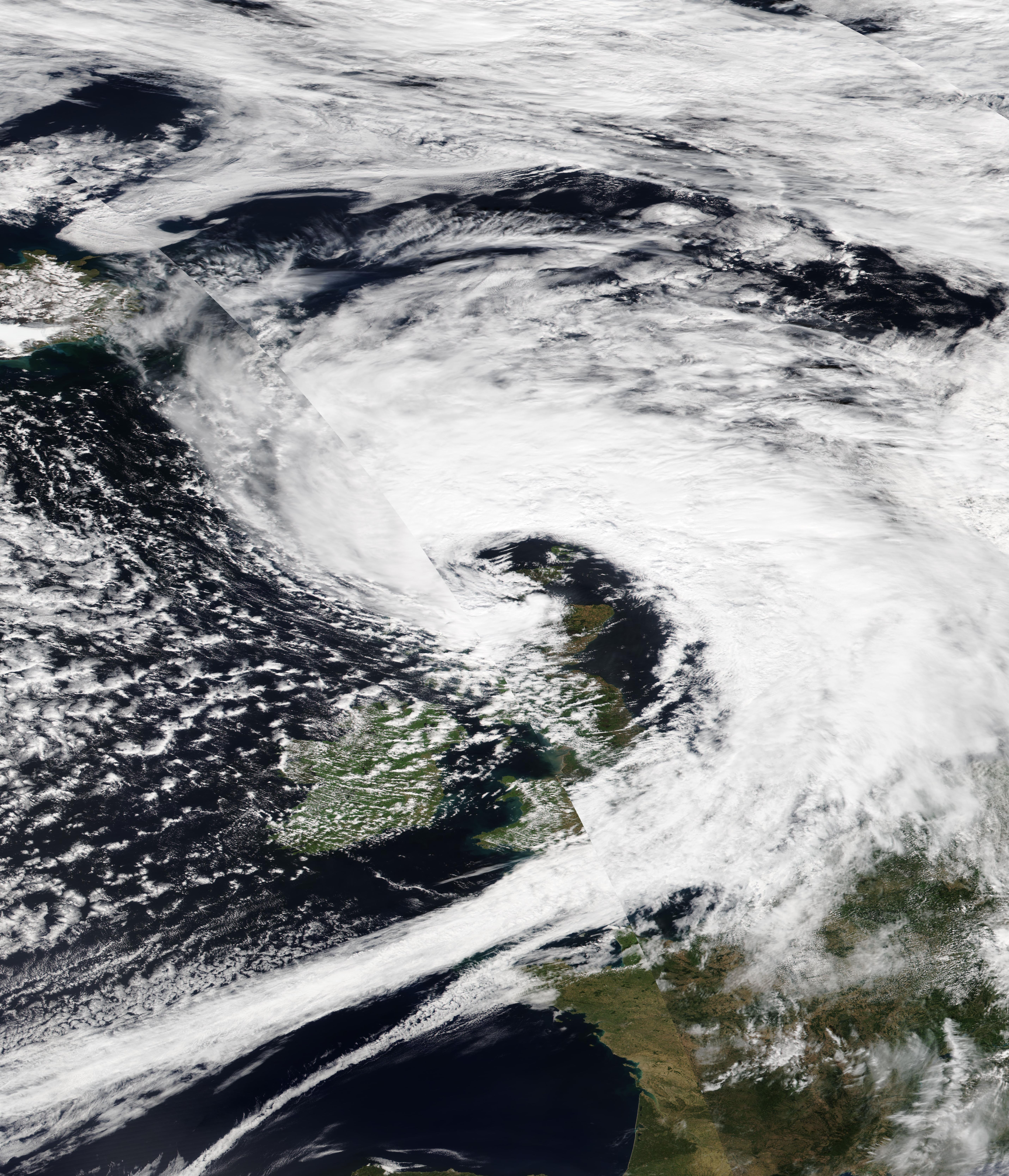
- Area affected: United Kingdom, Ireland, Denmark, Norway, Sweden, Finland
- Date of impact: 1–6 August 2025
- Maximum wind gust: 124 mph (200 km/h) at Cairngorm, Scotland
- Lowest pressure: 973 hPa (28.73 inHg)
- Fatalities: Unspecified
- Power outages: Unspecified

Storm Floris was named on 1 August 2025 by the Met Office. The same day, it was also named Ning by Free University of Berlin.

This system was expected deliver strong winds and heavy rainfall across the northern half of the country on Monday and early Tuesday the 4 & 5 August.

A Yellow wind warning, issued by the Met Office on Friday, 1 August, covered a significant swath of the northern UK. This included Northern Ireland, north Wales, northern England, and the entire expanse of Scotland, where the most intense winds were anticipated to be recorded. The warning was in effect from 6 AM on Monday, 4 August until 6 AM on Tuesday, 5 August 2025. Many inland areas within this warning zone could experience gusts of 40-50 mph, while exposed coastal areas and higher ground in Scotland may see winds reaching 60-70 mph, with a small chance of isolated gusts up to 85 mph. These conditions, combined with heavy rain, could lead to travel disruption, power cuts, and potential damage to buildings and trees. In Met Éireann issued yellow wind warnings for north-western counties.

A day later the Met Office issued an amber wind warning for much of mainland Scotland where gusts were likely to reach 80 to 90 mph on some exposed coasts, hills and bridges.

The Swedish Meteorological and Hydrological Institute issued a yellow wind warning for large parts of Västra Götaland County and southern Värmland County. During Tuesday windy with strong to very strong gusty winds, locally storm gusts.

Norwegian Meteorological Institute, issued orange wind warnings for south-western Norway with a larger yellow wind warning surrounding it, including Oslo. The storm was expected to bring heavy rainfall and strong winds to large parts of Southern Norway. The winds will be strongest in parts of Sunnhordland, Rogaland and Agder. We have issued an orange warning of locally very strong wind gusts with the possibility of gusts of 30–35 m/s on Tuesday.

Flights from Glasgow Airport to the Scottish islands were cancelled on Monday as the west of the country was battered by strong winds. In all, Aviation analytics company Cirium said 68 flights from UK airports have been cancelled. In Northern Ireland, several flights have been cancelled and thousands of homes are without power across the rest of the country after Storm Floris arrived overnight. Several councils have closed outdoor spaces, including parks and recycling centres.

The highest windspeed recorded by Storm Floris, was 124 mph (200 km/h), according to Met Office data.

=== Storm Lukas ===
Storm Lukas
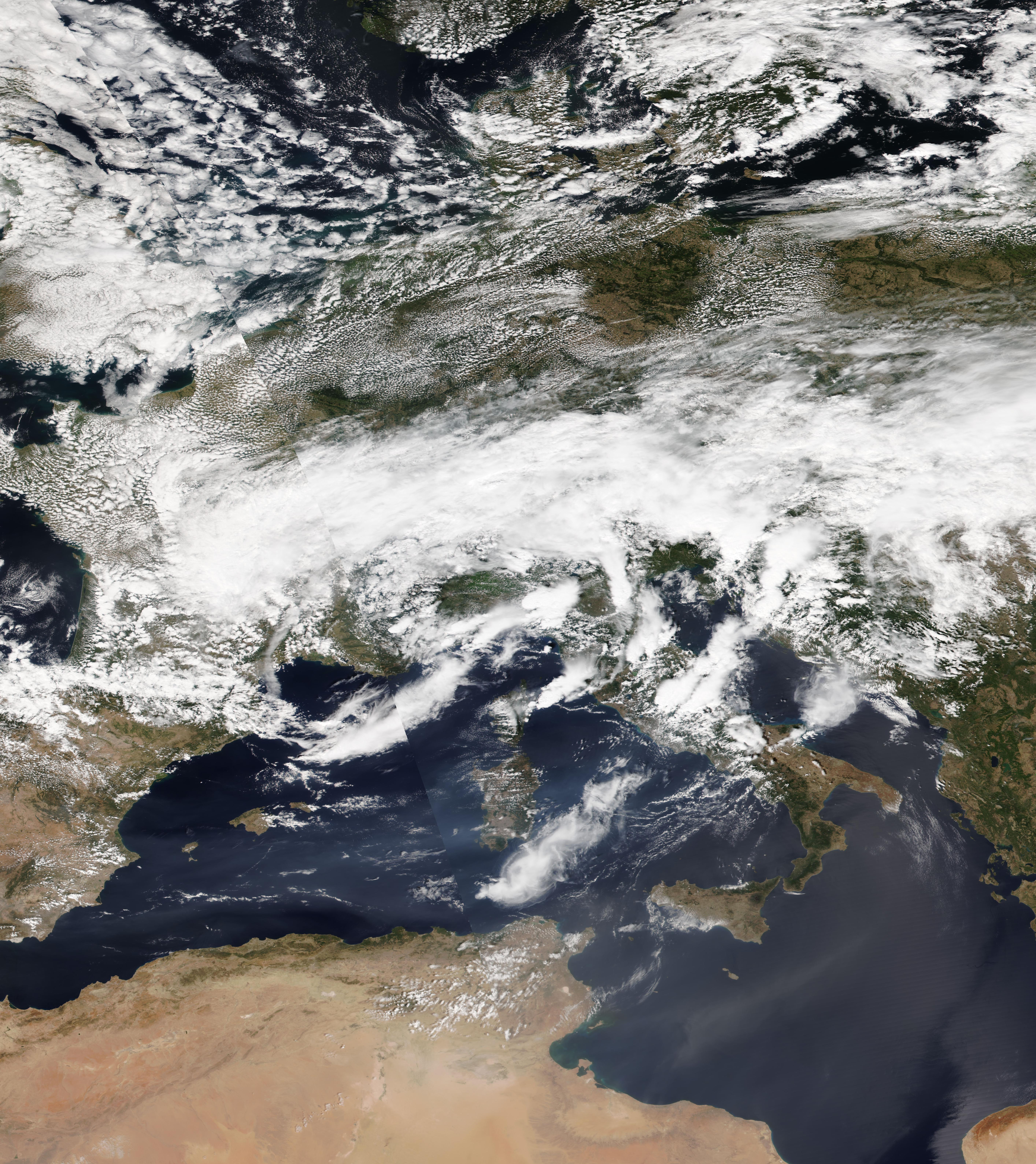
- Area affected: Italy, Croatia, Slovenia, Bosnia and Herzegovina
- Date of impact: 20–22 August 2025
- Fatalities: 1
- Power outages: Unspecified

Storm Lukas was named by the Italian Servizio Meteorologico on 20 August 2025.

One man died after being dragged away by an overflowing river in Sicily. The storm caused bridges to crumble and swept cars away.

=== Storm Augustin (Thomas) ===
Storm Augustin
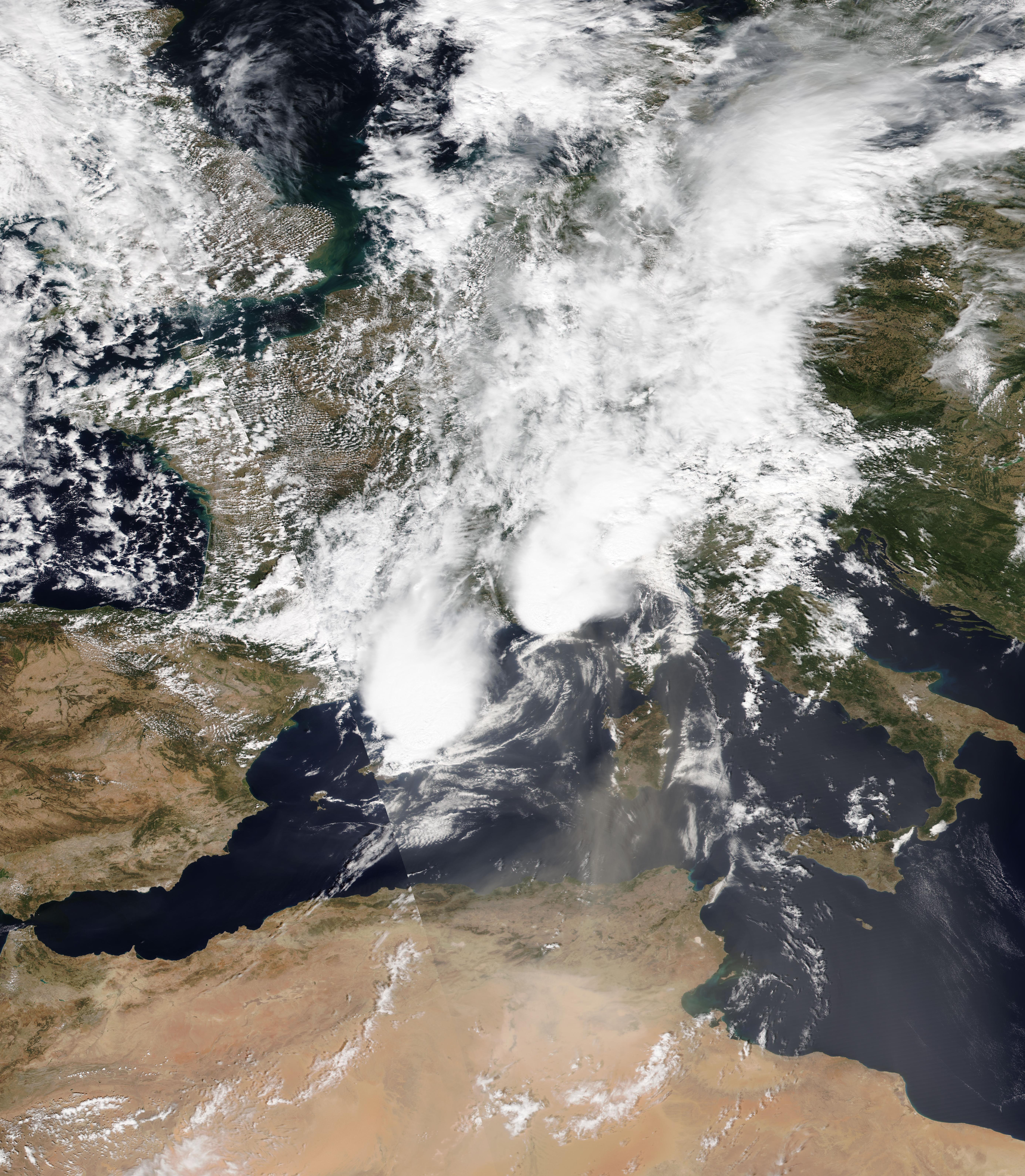
- Area affected: Switzerland, Italy, Austria
- Date of impact: 27–29 August 2025
- Fatalities: Unspecified
- Power outages: Unspecified

Storm Augustin was named on 27 August 2025 by Meteo Swiss. The Free University of Berlin also named the same system as Thomas.

Switzerland's state forecaster has issued the highest red alerts for parts of Ticino and Graubunden, which border northern Italy. Rainfall totals could exceed 260 mm (10 inches) in some areas, potentially triggering mudslides and causing rivers and streams to flood.

Red warnings for rain were in force for southern parts of Switzerland, as well as Lombardia, Liguria and Piedmont regions in north-western Italy.

== Season effects ==
Storm	FUB name	Dates active	Highest wind gust	Lowest pressure	Named by	Countries affected	Fatalities (+missing)
Atena	N/A	8–11 September 2024	Unspecified	1,000 hPa (29.53 inHg)	Italy	Croatia, Greece, Italy, The Balkans	4
Boris	Anett	11–17 September 2024	Unspecified	998 hPa (29.47 inHg)	Italy	Austria, Czech Republic, Hungary, Italy, Poland, Romania, Slovakia, Slovenia, Croatia, Serbia	26
Aitor	Constanze	25–28 September 2024	92 mph (148 km/h)	984 hPa (29.06 inHg)	Spain	United Kingdom, Ireland, France, Spain, Portugal	Unspecified
Cassandra	Finny	2–6 October 2024	Unspecified	997 hPa (29.44 inHg)	Montenegro	Bosnia and Herzegovina, Croatia, Italy, Corsica, Hungary, Austria	27
Kirk	N/A	8–11 October 2024	Unspecified	977 hPa (28.85 inHg)	NHC	France, Spain, Portugal, Germany, Luxembourg, Belgium, Switzerland, Sweden, Norway	1
Berenice	N/A	11–13 October 2024	80 mph (130 km/h)	981 hPa (28.97 inHg)	Spain	Spain, Portugal, Morocco	Unspecified
Ashley	Josefine	18–21 October 2024	120 mph (190 km/h)	959 hPa (28.32 inHg)	Ireland	United Kingdom, Ireland, Norway	Unspecified
Jakob	Martina	31 October–2 November 2024	Unspecified	970 hPa (28.64 inHg)	Norway	Norway, Sweden, Finland, Estonia, Latvia, Lithuania	Unspecified
Alexandros	N/A	16–18 November 2024	Unspecified	1,008 hPa (29.77 inHg)	Greece	Greece, Cyprus, Turkey	Unspecified
Quiteria	N/A	16–22 November 2024	Unspecified	965 hPa (28.50 inHg)	Germany	United Kingdom, Ireland, France, Belgium, Luxembourg, Netherlands, Germany, Switzerland, Poland, Denmark, Sweden, Finland, Latvia, Lithuania, Estonia	Unspecified
Caetano	Renate	19–23 November 2024	Unspecified	976 hPa (28.82 inHg)	Spain	United Kingdom, France, Spain, Germany, Switzerland, Italy, Croatia, Slovenia	Unspecified
Bert	Sigrid	21–26 November 2024	112 mph (180 km/h)	940 hPa (27.76 inHg)	Ireland	United Kingdom, Ireland	5
Conall	Telse	26–29 November 2024	79 mph (127 km/h)	994 hPa (29.35 inHg)	Netherlands	United Kingdom, Netherlands, Denmark, Germany, Poland	1
Bora	N/A	29 November–3 December 2024	Unspecified	1,008 hPa (29.77 inHg)	Greece	Greece, North Macedonia, Bulgaria, Kosovo, Albania, Serbia, Montenegro, Turkey, Italy	3
Darragh	Xaveria	5–9 December 2024	96 mph (154 km/h)	977 hPa (28.85 inHg)	United Kingdom	United Kingdom, Ireland, Netherlands, Belgium, France	4
Dorothea	Anka	15–22 December 2024	Unspecified	963 hPa (28.44 inHg)	Spain	Azores, Canary Islands, Ireland, United Kingdom, Norway, Sweden	Unspecified
Sif	Ziva	16–18 December 2024	Unspecified	973 hPa (28.73 inHg)	Norway	Iceland, Norway, Denmark, Sweden, Germany, Poland, Finland, Estonia, Latvia, Lithuania, Ukraine	Unspecified
Bianca	N/A	17–19 December 2024	Unspecified	980 hPa (28.94 inHg)	Germany	United Kingdom, France, Belgium, Netherlands, Germany, Denmark	Unspecified
Dionisio	N/A	18–21 December 2024	Unspecified	994 hPa (29.35 inHg)	Italy	Italy, Slovenia, Croatia, Bosnia and Herzegovina, Greece	Unspecified
Enol	Diana	20–23 December 2024	82 mph (132 km/h)	957 hPa (28.26 inHg)	France	United Kingdom, Ireland. Netherlands, France	Unspecified
Elena	N/A	23–27 December 2024	Unspecified	988 hPa (29.18 inHg)	Italy	Italy, Slovenia, Croatia, Bosnia and Herzegovina, Kosovo, Serbia, Greece	Unspecified
Ginette	N/A	30 December 2024–2 January 2025	Unspecified	975 hPa (28.79 inHg)	Germany	United Kingdom, Ireland, Norway, Sweden, Denmark, Netherlands, Belgium, France, Germany, Poland, Finland, Latvia, Lithuania, Estonia	Unspecified
Floriane	Bernd	2–9 January 2025	Unspecified	952 hPa (28.11 inHg)	France	United Kingdom, Ireland, Netherlands, Belgium, Norway, Sweden, Denmark, Germany	Unspecified
Felix	N/A	11–15 January 2025	Unspecified	1,004 hPa (29.65 inHg)	Italy	Italy, Croatia, Bosnia and Herzegovina	Unspecified
Gabri	N/A	16–19 January 2025	Unspecified	1,006 hPa (29.71 inHg)	Italy	Italy, Tunisia, Algeria	Unspecified
Garoe	N/A	17–23 January 2025	Unspecified	984 hPa (29.06 inHg)	Portugal	Azores Archipelago, Madeira Archipelago, Portugal, Spain	Unspecified
Éowyn	Gilles	21-27 January 2025	135 mph (217 km/h)	939 hPa (27.73 inHg)	United Kingdom	United Kingdom, Ireland, Netherlands, Norway, France	2
Herminia	Ivo	24-30 January 2025	83 mph (134 km/h)	948 hPa (27.99 inHg)	Spain	United Kingdom, Ireland, Spain, Portugal, France	Unspecified
Ivo	Julian	27-31 January 2025	Unspecified	987 hPa (29.15 inHg)	Portugal	United Kingdom, Spain, Portugal, France	Unspecified
Coral	N/A	18-25 February 2025	Unspecified	1,013 hPa (29.91 inHg)	Israel	Israel, Cyprus, Turkey	Unspecified
Jana	N/A	6-12 March 2025	Unspecified	973 hPa (28.73 inHg)	Spain	Spain, Portugal, France	Unspecified
Konrad	N/A	10-14 March 2025	Unspecified	985 hPa (29.09 inHg)	Portugal	Azores Archipelago, Madeira Archipelago, Portugal	Unspecified
Laurence	N/A	14-18 March 2025	Unspecified	980 hPa (28.94 inHg)	Portugal	Azores Archipelago, Portugal, Spain	3
Martinho	Volker	18-22 March 2025	Unspecified	975 hPa (28.79 inHg)	Portugal	Portugal, Spain	Unspecified
Nuria	N/A	1-5 April 2025	77 mph (124 km/h)	985 hPa (29.09 inHg)	Spain	Portugal, Canary Islands, Spain	Unspecified
Olivier	N/A	7-13 April 2025	Unspecified	1,003 hPa (29.62 inHg)	Spain	Canary Islands, Spain, Morocco	Unspecified
Darius	N/A	14-18 April 2025	Unspecified	989 hPa (29.21 inHg)	Germany	Spain, France, United Kingdom, Ireland	Unspecified
Hans	N/A	15-18 April 2025	Unspecified	992 hPa (29.29 inHg)	Italy	Italy, Switzerland, France	4
Ines	N/A	14–17 May 2025	Unspecified	997 hPa (29.44 inHg)	Italy	Italy, Croatia, Slovenia, Bosnia and Herzegovina, Serbia, Greece, Tunisia, Algeria	Unspecified
Floris	Ning	1-6 August 2025	124 mph (200 km/h)	973 hPa (28.73 inHg)	United Kingdom	United Kingdom, Ireland, Denmark, Norway, Sweden, Finland	Unspecified
Lukas	N/A	20-22 August 2025	Unspecified	1,004 hPa (29.65 inHg)	Italy	Italy, Croatia, Slovenia, Bosnia and Herzegovina	1
Augustin	Thomas	27-29 August 2025	Unspecified	999 hPa (29.50 inHg)	Switzerland	Switzerland, Italy, Austria	

== See also ==
- Weather of: 2024
- Tropical cyclones in: 2024, 2025
- 2024 European floods
- 2024–25 North American winter
- List of historical European windstorm names
