= Ashley (given name) =

- Pronunciation: /ˈæʃli/
- Gender: Unisex
- Language: English

Origin
- Language: Old English
- Origin: Combination of æsċ and lēah
- Meaning: "Ash tree meadow"
- Region of origin: England

Other names
- Variant forms: Ashlee, Ashlie, Ashleigh
- Short form: Ash
- Related names: Ashton, Asher

Ashley, sometimes Ashly, is a given name which was originally an Old English surname. It is derived from the Old English (Anglo-Saxon) words æsċ (ash) and lēah (clearing, meadow) and translates to "Dweller near the ash tree meadow".

== Regional variations ==
=== England and Wales ===
The use of Ashley as a first name began in England after 1860, likely in honour of Anthony Ashley-Cooper, 7th Earl of Shaftesbury, a social reformer styled Lord Ashley. It was used more intensely starting in the 1970s. Appearances of the boys' name in popular culture include Ashley Wilkes in 1939's Gone with the Wind and Ash Williams (Ashley Williams) in the 1981 film The Evil Dead.

Ashley in England and Wales was used predominately for boys, ranking at #33 in 1994 for boys and staying within the top 100–300 male names given each year. Ashley was used for English girls but the Ashleigh spelling was preferred, reaching a rank of #55 in 1994.

=== Scotland ===
Ashley was popular for girls from the 1970s and peaked in popularity in 1987 ranking #10 for girls.

=== Ireland ===
Ashley is generally more common for Irish born girls than boys, with the Ashleigh spelling being almost as popular and only ranking for girls.

=== Australia ===
Ashley entered the top 100 names for boys in New South Wales in 1971 but became more popular for girls in 1986. It reached a ranking of #17 for girls in 1987, and left the top 100 in 2011. It reached a ranking of #56 in 1985 for boys. For women, the Ashleigh spelling is as common as Ashley and reached a ranking of #13 in 1990.

=== United States of America ===
In the 1940s, Americans started using the name Ashley for girls and was more common for girls starting in 1964. Ashley was considered a surname style name at the time. In the 1980s the name had a rise in popularity attributed to the female soap opera character Ashley Abbott who emerged on the still-running TV series The Young and the Restless in 1982. Spelling variants of the name such as Ashlee, Ashleigh, and Ashlie are also in use.

== Notable men named Ashley ==
- Ashley Adams (1955–2015), Australian Paralympic shooting medallist and cattle grazier
- Ashley Ambrose (born 1970), American football player
- Ashley Banjo (born 1988), English dancer with the dance troupe Diversity
- Ashley Barnes (born 1989), English footballer playing for Burnley FC
- Ashley Bickerton (1959–2022), Barbadian-born American contemporary artist
- Ashley Bloomfield (born 1966), New Zealand public health official
- Ashley Bryan (1923–2022), American writer
- Ashley Buchholz, Canadian musician and member of alternative/dance duo Ubiquitous Synergy Seeker
- Ashley Cain (footballer) (born 1990), English ex-footballer
- Ashley Callus (born 1979), Australian swimmer
- Ashley Carrington, pseudonym of German writer Rainer M. Schröder
- Ashley Chambers (born 1990), English professional footballer
- Ashley Church (born 1964), New Zealand Property commentator
- Ashley Cole (born 1980), English footballer
- Ashley Fisher (born 1975), Australian tennis player
- Ashley Giles (born 1973), English cricketer
- Ashley Hamilton (born 1974), American actor
- Ashley Hansen (born 1983), Australian rules footballer
- Ashley Hicks (born 1963), British architect
- Ashley Horne (born 1989), English musician/comedian and member of the group The Midnight Beast
- Ashley Hutchings (born 1945), British folk musician
- Ashley Kumar (born 1986), English actor
- Ashley Lelie (born 1980), American football player
- Ashley MacIsaac (born 1975), Canadian professional fiddler
- Ashley Mallett (born 1945), Australian cricketer
- Ashley McIntosh (born 1972), Australian rules footballer
- Ashley Montagu (1905–1999), British anthropologist and humanist
- Ashley Null, American theologian
- Ashley Nurse (born 1988), Barbadian cricketer
- Ashley Parker Angel (born 1981), American singer, songwriter and actor
- Ashley Purdy (born 1984), bassist and backing vocalist of the American rock band Black Veil Brides
- Ashley Ramdass, Mauritian politician
- Ashley Remington (born 1986), American pro wrestler in Chikara
- Ashley Rice (born 1986), English actor
- Ashley Sampi (born 1983), Australian rules footballer
- Ashley Sauls, South African politician
- Ashley Sexton (born 1987), British professional boxer
- Ashley Shaw (cricketer) (born 1991), English cricketer
- Ashley Sheppard (born 1969), American football player
- Ashley Slater (born 1961), British musician
- Ash Stymest (Ashley Stymest, born 1991), British model, songwriter
- Ashley Taylor Dawson (born 1982), British actor
- Ashley Theophane (born 1980), British professional boxer
- Ashley Vincent (born 1985), English footballer
- Ashley Wallbridge (born 1988), English DJ, producer and remixer
- Ashley Walters (born 1982), British actor
- Ashley Walters (artist) (born 1983), South African photographer
- Ashley Ward (born 1970), English footballer
- Ashley Westwood (footballer, born 1976), English footballer and football manager
- Ashley Westwood (footballer, born 1990), English footballer
- Ashley Williams (boxer) (born 1991), Welsh professional soldier and heavyweight boxer
- Ashley Wood (born 1971), Australian comic book and concept artist
- Ashley Young (born 1985), English footballer
- Ashley Zukerman (born 1983), Australian actor

== Notable women named Ashley ==
- Ashley (singer) (Ashley Colon; born 1971), Puerto Rican merengue singer
- Ashley Argota (born 1993), American actress
- Ashley Audrain (born 1982), Canadian author
- Ashley Aune, American business owner and politician
- Ashley Bartley, American politician from Vermont
- Ashley Benson (born 1989), American actress
- Ashley Benton, American girl who killed Gabriel Granillo in 2006
- Ashley Biden (born 1981), American social worker, activist, philanthropist, and fashion designer; daughter of former First Lady Jill Biden and former US President Joe Biden
- Ashley Nicole Black (born 1985), American comedian
- Ashley Blue (born 1981), American porn star
- Ashlee Bond (born 1985), American-Israeli Olympic show jumping rider who competes for Israel
- Ashley Bouder (born 1983), American ballet dancer
- Ashley Brace (born 1991), Welsh boxer
- Ashley C. Bradley, American screenwriter
- Ashley Callie (1976–2008), South African actress
- Ashley Callingbull (born 1989), Canadian beauty pageant titleholder
- Ashley Cariño (born 1994), Puerto Rican-American model and beauty pageant titleholder
- Ashley Connor, American cinematographer
- Ashley Dalton (born 1972), British Labour politician
- Ashley Alexandra Dupré (born 1985), American prostitute-turned-sex columnist
- Ashley Eckstein (born 1981), American actress
- Ashley Field (born 1989), American basketball player
- Ashley Fliehr (born 1986), American professional wrestler best known as Charlotte Flair
- Ashley Force Hood (born 1982), American drag racer
- Ashley Frangipane (born 1994), known professionally as Halsey, American singer and songwriter
- Ashley Freiberg (born 1991), American racing driver
- Ashley Grace (musician) (born 1987), American singer-songwriter
- Ashley Graham (model) (born 1987), American plus-sized model and television presenter
- Ashley Greene (born 1987), American actress
- Ashley Grossman (born 1993), American water polo player
- Ashley Harkleroad (born 1985), American professional tennis player
- Ashley Henley (1981–2021), American politician
- Ashley Iaconetti (born 1988), American television personality and journalist
- Ashley Jensen (born 1969), British actress
- Ashley Judd (born 1968 as Ashley Tyler Ciminella), American actress
- Ashley Klymchuk (born 1993), Canadian curler
- Ashley Leggat (born 1986), Canadian actress
- Ashley Leechin (born 1993), American social media personality and nurse
- Ashley Liao (born 2001), American actress
- Ashley Marie Livingston (born 1986), American model and actress known professionally as AzMarie
- Ashley Madekwe (born 1983), English actress
- Ashley Massaro (1979–2019), American professional wrestler and model
- Ashley Monroe (born 1986), American singer-songwriter
- Ashley Nee (born 1989), American slalom canoeist
- Ashley Newbrough (born 1987), American actress
- Ashley Olsen (born 1986), American actress and businesswoman
- Ashley Ortega (born 1998), Filipina actress and professional figure skater
- Ashley Owens, American Paralympic swimmer
- Ashley Owusu (born 2001), American basketball player
- Ashley Paris (born 1987), American basketball player
- Ashley Peldon (born 1984), American actress
- Ashley Roberts (born 1981), member of The Pussycat Dolls
- Ashley Sanchez (born 1999), American professional soccer player
- Ashley Scott (born 1977), American actress and model
- Ashley Shaw (dancer) (born 1990), Australian ballet dancer
- Ashlee Simpson (born 1984), American singer, television personality and sister to Jessica Simpson
- Ashley Slanina-Davies (born 1989), British actress
- Ashley Spillers (born 1986), American actress
- Ashley Spencer (actress) (born 1985), American actress, singer, and dancer
- Ashley Spencer (hurdler) (born 1993), American sprinter and hurdler
- Ashlee Sullivan (born 2006), American artistic gymnast
- Ashley Tisdale (born 1985), American singer and actress
- Ashley Wagner (born 1991), American figure skater
- Ashley Whitney (born 1979), American freestyle swimmer
- Ashley Christina Williams (born 1984), American actress
- Ashley Churchill Williams (born 1978), American actress
- Ashley Jaye Williams (born 1987), American multidisciplinary artist
- Ashley X (born 1997), the "pillow angel" from Seattle; subject of the Ashley Treatment

== Notable people named Ashly ==
- Ashly Burch (born 1990), American actress and television writer
- Ashly DelGrosso (born 1982), American dancer
- Ashly Lorenzana (born 1987), American sex worker and freelance writer
- Ashly Rae, Scottish former model and actress
- Ashly Stohl (born 1972), American photographer

== Notable people named Ashli ==
- Ashli Babbitt (born 1987 or 1988), protester fatally shot during the United States Capitol attack in Washington D.C.

== Notable people named Ashlei ==
- Ashlei Sharpe Chestnut, American Broadway, flim, and television actress
- Ashlei Spivey (born 1986), Nebraskan state senator

== Disambiguation pages ==
- Ashley Bell (disambiguation)
- Ashley Black
- Ashley Brown (disambiguation)
- Ashley Cain (disambiguation)
- Ashley Campbell (disambiguation)
- Ashley Cooper (disambiguation)
- Ashley Davies (disambiguation)
- Ashley Davis
- Ashley Day
- Ashley Grace (disambiguation)
- Ashley Graham
- Ashley Grimes (disambiguation)
- Ashley Hall (disambiguation)
- Ashley Hart
- Ashley Hunter
- Ashley Jackson (disambiguation)
- Ashley James
- Ashley Johnson (disambiguation)
- Ashley Kelly
- Ashley Lane (disambiguation)
- Ashley Lawrence (disambiguation)
- Ashley McKenzie (disambiguation)
- Ashley Miller (disambiguation)
- Ashley Morgan
- Ashley Morris (disambiguation)
- Ashley Palmer
- Ashley Robertson
- Ashley Smith (disambiguation)
- Ashley Spencer (disambiguation)
- Ashley Westwood
- Ashley Williams (disambiguation)
- Ashley Wright
- Ashley Young (disambiguation)

== Fictional characters ==
- Ash Williams, protagonist in the Evil Dead film series
- Ashley Abbott, a character in the America soap opera The Young and the Restless
- Ashley Albright, Lindsay Lohan's character in Just My Luck
- Ashley Banks, a character in the sitcom The Fresh Prince of Bel-Air
- Ashley Barnstormer, an antagonist in the America web series Video Game High School
- Ashley Barton / Spider-Bitch, a Marvel Comics supervillain
- Ashley Bernitz, an antagonist in the game Ace Combat 5: The Unsung War
- Ashley Dewitt, an antagonist to the main character in Hannah Montana
- Ashley Graham, a Resident Evil 4 character
- Ashley Hammond, a Power Rangers character
- Ashley Juergens, a character in the teen drama show The Secret Life of the American Teenager
- Ashley Magnus, a character in the science fiction-fantasy series Sanctuary
- Ashley Marin, a character from the television series Pretty Little Liars
- Ashley Mendlebach, a character in the TV film Bad Hair Day
- Ashley Mizuki Robbins, heroine in the Another Code video game series
- Ashley Peacock, a character from the British soap opera Coronation Street
- Ashley Riot, protagonist in the Vagrant Story video game
- Ashley Spinelli, a character from Recess
- Ashley Thomas, a character in the British soap opera Emmerdale
- Ashley Wilkes, central character in the 1936 novel Gone With the Wind and the 1939 film adaptation
- Ashley Williams (Mass Effect), female soldier in the Mass Effect video game series named after the Evil Dead character
- Ashley Winchester, the main character of role-playing video game Wild Arms 2
- Ashley "Leyley" Graves, protagonist of The Coffin of Andy and Leyley
- Ashley, a sketch character from the children's comedy series All That
- Ashley, a character from the WarioWare video game series

== See also ==
- Asher (name)
- Ashley (surname)
- Aisling (given name)
- Leigh (disambiguation)
- Lee (given name)
- Lee (English surname)
- Ashleigh, a page for people with the given name "Ashleigh"
