= Ashleigh =

- Pronunciation: /ˈæʃli/
- Gender: Female
- Language: English

Origin
- Origin: Old English
- Meaning: Ash tree meadow
- Region of origin: England

Other names
- Variant form: Ashlee
- Related names: Ashley

Ashleigh is a form of the English surname Ashley, from the Old English æsc (ash trees) and lēah (wood, clearing, meadow, enclosure) meaning "dweller near the ash tree forest". As a first name it is the most common spelling for women in England and Wales.

== Notable people ==
=== A ===
- Ashleigh Aitken, American politician

=== B ===
- Ashleigh Ball (born 1983), Canadian voice actress
- Ashleigh Ball (field hockey) (born 1986), British field hockey player
- Ashleigh Banfield (born 1967), Canadian-American journalist
- Ashleigh Barty (born 1996), Australian tennis player
- Ashleigh Baxter (born 1991), Irish rugby union footballer
- Ashleigh Brazill (born 1989), Australian netball player
- Ashleigh Brennan (born 1991), Australian gymnast
- Ashleigh Brewer (born 1990), Australian actress
- Ashleigh Brilliant (1933–2025), English author
- Ashleigh Buch (born 1984), American soldier
- Ashleigh Buhai (born 1989), South African golfer

=== C ===
- Ashleigh Clare-Kearney (born 1986), American gymnast
- Ashleigh Connor (1989–2011), Australian footballer
- Ashleigh Cummings (born 1992), Australian actress

=== D ===
- Ashleigh Dallas (born 1994), Australian singer-songwriter

=== F ===
- Ashleigh Francis (born 1988), Australian model

=== G ===
- Ashleigh Gardner (born 1997), Australian cricketer
- Ashleigh Gillon, Australian journalist
- Ashleigh Gnat (born 1994), American gymnast
- Ashleigh Gray, Scottish actress
- Ashleigh Guest (born 1990), Australian rules footballer
- Ashleigh Gunning (born 1985), American soccer player

=== H ===
- Ashleigh Crystal Hairston, American actress and screenwriter
- Ashleigh Harrington (born 1989), Canadian actress
- Ashleigh Hewson (born 1979), Australian rugby union footballer

=== I ===
- Ashleigh Isenbarger (born 1997), Australian basketball player

=== J ===
- Ashleigh Johnson (born 1994), American water polo player

=== K ===
- Ashleigh Karaitiana (born 1992), New Zealand-Australian basketball player

=== L ===
- Ashleigh Lynch (born 1990), English cricketer

=== M ===
- Ashleigh McConnell (born 1996), Australian Paralympic swimmer
- Ashleigh McIvor (born 1983), Canadian skier
- Ashleigh Moolman Pasio (born 1985), South African cyclist
- Ashleigh Aston Moore (1981–2007), Canadian actress
- Ashleigh Murray (born 1988), American actress

=== N ===
- Ashleigh Nelson (disambiguation), multiple people
- Ashleigh Neville (born 1993), English footballer

=== P ===
- Ashleigh Pilbrow (1912–1995), English athlete
- Ashleigh Fay Pittaway (born 2000), German-British skeleton racer
- Ashleigh Plumptre (born 1998), English footballer

=== R ===
- Ashleigh Rainey (born 1985), Northern Irish lawn bowler
- Ashleigh Riddell (born 1996), Australian rules footballer
- Ashleigh Shelby Rosette, American academic administrator
- Ashleigh Ross (born 2000), Australian actress

=== S ===
- Ashleigh Shanti (born 1991), American chef
- Ashleigh Shim (born 1993), Jamaican footballer
- Ashleigh Southern (born 1992), Australian water polo player
- Ashleigh Spencer (born 1992), Australian basketball player
- Ashleigh Sykes (born 1991), Australian footballer

=== V ===
- Ashleigh Vaughn (born 1999), South African water polo player

=== W ===
- Ashleigh Ward (born 1994), New Zealand footballer
- Ashleigh Weerden (born 1999), Dutch footballer
- Ashleigh Whiffin, English entomologist
- Ashleigh Whitfield (born 1980), British broadcaster
- Ashleigh Woodland (born 1998), Australian rules footballer

=== Y ===
- Ashleigh Young (born 1983), New Zealand poet

== Notable people with "Ashleigh" surname ==
- Charles Ashleigh (1892–1974), English activist
- Dave Ashleigh (born 1943), American water polo player
