= Ashley =

Ashley is a place name derived from the Old English words æsċ (“ash”) and lēah (“meadow”). It may refer to:

== People and fictional characters ==
- Ashley (given name), a list of people and fictional characters with the given name
- Ashley (surname), a list of people
- Ashley (singer) (born 1975), Puerto Rican singer
- Ashley, South Korean singer and leader of Ladies' Code
- Ashley, a character from the WarioWare video game series.

== Places ==
=== Australia ===
- Ashley, New South Wales

=== England ===
- Ashley, Cambridgeshire
- Ashley, Cheshire
- Ashley, Dorset, a settlement in St Leonards and St Ives parish
- Ashley, Gloucestershire
- Ashley, East Hampshire
- Ashley, New Forest, Hampshire
- Ashley, Test Valley, Hampshire
- Ashley, Kent
- Ashley, Northamptonshire
- Ashley, Staffordshire
- Ashley, Wiltshire
- Ashley (Bristol ward)
- Ashley Heath, Dorset

=== New Zealand ===
- Ashley, New Zealand
  - Ashley (New Zealand electorate), a former electorate 1866–1902
  - Ashley River / Rakahuri, which flows past the settlement in Canterbury

=== United States ===
- Ashley County, Arkansas
- Ashley, Illinois
- Ashley, Indiana
- Ashley, Michigan
- Ashley, Missouri
- Ashley, North Dakota
- Ashley, Ohio
- Ashley, Pennsylvania, the most populous place with the name
- Ashley, West Virginia
- Ashley, Wisconsin
- Ashley River, South Carolina

== Music ==
- "Ashley", a 2008 song from This War Is Ours by Escape the Fate
- "Ashley", a 2008 song from Visiter by The Dodos
- "Ashley", a 2012 song from ¡Dos! by Green Day
- "Ashley", a 2013 song from Hall of Fame by Big Sean
- "Ashley", a 2020 song from Manic by Halsey

== Other uses ==
- Ashley (automobile), a kit car manufactured in England from 1954 to 1962
- Ashley (restaurant), a South Korean restaurant chain
- Ashley Furniture, an American furniture company
- Ashley Script, a typeface created by Ashley Havinden
- Ashley Treatment, a controversial treatment for static encephalopathy
- Corbett v Corbett, otherwise Ashley , 1970 English transsexual divorce case
- Storm Ashley, 2024 storm in north-western Europe

== See also ==
- The Ashley Book of Knots, a reference manual on the use, history, appearance, and tying of knots by Clifford Ashley
- Aşlı, a medieval Volga Bulgarian town
