= Redemption Bank =

Bank based in Holladay, UT

- Redemption Bank's main office in Holladay, Utah
- Type: Privately Held Company
- Industry: Banking
- Founded: 1974; 52 years ago (as Bank of Holladay [1974-1976] and Holladay Bank & Trust [1976-2025]); 2025; 1 year ago (as Redemption Bank)
- Headquarters: Holladay, Utah, United States
- Key people: Ashley D. Bell (Chairman); Bernice King (Senior Vice President); Jan Ackley (CEO)
- Products: Retail banking
- Owner: Redemption Holding Company
- Website: www.redemptionbank.com

Redemption Bank is an African American-owned bank based in Holladay, Utah, United States. It is the first and only Black-owned bank headquartered in the Mountain West.

As of March 31, 2025, the bank had one branch and maintained US$65.7 million in total assets. As of March 31, 2026, the bank maintained US$71.6 million in total assets.

== History ==
The bank was established on February 20, 1974 as "Bank of Holladay" by Ronald N. Spratling Jr. The bank was renamed to "Holladay Bank & Trust" in 1976, and continued to operate under that name until being acquired in 2025. Katie Spratling, the founder's daughter, has served as the bank's president since 2010 and became the interim CEO in 2026.

=== Redemption ===
On June 9, 2025, Redemption Holding Company, organized by Ashley Bell and Bernice King, acquired Holladay Bank & Trust. The original purchase of Holladay Bank was announced in 2023 but was delayed due to the collapse of Silicon Valley Bank. On August 11, 2025, the bank reorganized as Redemption Bank. The purchase was backed by a group of investors that included Ally Financial and Central Bancorporation. Also, Redemption reported Collin Sexton (backed by TribeAngels and Coinlete), Rick Durham and Christena Huntsman Durham, the George S. and Dolores Doré Eccles Foundation, the Robert H. & Katharine B. Garff Foundation, the Huntsman Family Foundation, Peter and Brynn Huntsman, the Larry H. & Gail Miller Family Foundation, Patel Family Investments, the Sorenson Impact Foundation and the James Lee Sorenson Family Foundation as early investors.

The bank launched a new debit card called the "Bank King Card" on Juneteenth 2026. The card is named in honor of Martin Luther King Jr., father to director and founding member Bernice King. The card includes both debit and credit card options, and the bank will make a donation from every account opened to nonprofits that will provide funding to families in need. It is aimed at helping single mothers who live in government-subsidized housing escape poverty. One of the inaugural partners will be the Georgia Resilience and Opportunity ("GRO") Fund and its guaranteed income program, In Her Hands.

A "Bank King Credit Card" is expected to be introduced later with interest rates capped at 12 percent.

== Chief executive officer ==
The position was established after the acquisition and rebrand as Redemption Bank.

- Bruce T. Jensen (2025–2026)
- Katie Spratling (2026) (Interim)
- Jan A. Ackley (2026-present)

== Legacy ==
Founder Ronald N. Spratling Sr. said that Bank of Holladay was unique at its founding because they intended to stay a "small bank" to attract the local community. In his experience as an advisory board member for a national bank, he'd seen loan applications rejected that were filed by "'good people' in the community who were 'creditworthy.'" Outside of the local community, Spratling also knew that the bank needed loyal customers, so the bank had offered one of the highest daily interest rates in Utah for passbook savings accounts and IRAs at 7.5%. At the time, something else unusual was being open on Saturdays.

The bank's board was largely controlled by a majority of women, unusual in the banking industry.

The acquisition by Redemption Holding Company is the first Black-led acquisition of a non-minority-owned bank in U.S. history. The bank is the first Black-owned bank headquartered outside a historically underserved community.
