= List of storms named Ashley =

The name Ashley has been used to name one tropical cyclone worldwide in the South-West Indian Ocean. It has also been used for one extratropical European windstorm.

In the South-West Indian Ocean:

- Tropical Storm Ashley (2022) – a tropical storm that remained far out to sea.

In Europe:

- Storm Ashley (2024) – an extratropical cyclone that impacted in some portions of Ireland, United Kingdom and Norway caused by major damage.
