= Ashley Day =

Ashley Day may refer to:

- Ashley Day (English cricketer) (born 1969)
- Ashley Day (Australian cricketer) (born 1999)
