= David Carol =

- Born: August 23, 1958 (age 67)
- Occupation: Photographer
- Website: www.davidcarol.com

David Jeffrey Carol (born August 23, 1958) is the editor-in-chief of Peanut Press, which he co-founded with Ashly Stohl, and the author of a number of photography books. He is the former Director of Photography at Outfront Media and was a contributing editor and writer for Photo District News' Emerging Photographer series. He was also a writer at Rangefinder Magazine, authoring a column entitled "Photo Finish."

== Biography ==
Carol grew up in Jericho, New York and later attended the School of Visual Arts and The New School for Social Research where he studied under Lisette Model.

Carol's first book, 40 Miles of Bad Road... (2004), a collection of photographs from 1993 to 2003, and second book, All My Lies are True... (2009), were each selected as "Best Book of the Year" by Photo District News. His third 'book', "This is Why We Can't Have Nice Things!" (2011), was in fact a collection of photographs stored inside a lucite box, a contraption which Carol calls a "non-book." His fourth book, No Plan B (2016), was a retrospective of 32 black-and-white photographs published in conjunction with his 2017 exhibition at the Leica Gallery in SoHo.

== Books ==
- 40 Miles of Bad Road... Chicago, IL: Stephen Daiter Gallery, 2004. Edited by Abby Robinson, with an afterword by Anne Wilkes Tucker.
- All My Lies are True... Kabloona, 2009.
- This is Why We Can't Have Nice Things!. Kabloona, 2011. With an essay by Jodi Peckman. Edition of 251.
- Where's the Monkey?. Café Royal, Southport, England: 2013. Edition of 250.
- Here's The Deal. Café Royal, Southport, England: 2014. Edition of 150.
- All My Pictures Look The Same. Café Royal, Southport, England: 2014. Edition of 250.
- No Plan B. Peanut Press, Los Angeles, CA: 2016. With an essay by Jason Eskenazi. ISBN 978-0-9977219-0-4
