= Ashley Johnson (disambiguation) =

Ashley Johnson (born 1983) is an American actress, voice actress and singer.

Ashley Johnson may also refer to:

- Ashley Johnson (rugby union) (born 1986), South African rugby union player
- Ashley S. Johnson (1857–1925), Protestant minister who founded Johnson University in Tennessee
- Ashley Johnson (footballer) (born 1990), American-born Puerto Rican footballer
- Ashley T. Johnson, American FBI official
- Ash Johnson (born 1997), Australian rules footballer for Collingwood

== See also ==
- Ashleigh Johnson (born 1994), American water polo player
- Ashley Johnston (born 1992), Canadian ice hockey player
