= Ashley James =

Ashley James may refer to:

- Ashley James (curator), American curator
- Ashley James (television personality), contestant on Celebrity Big Brother
- Ashley James (broadcaster), British broadcaster, DJ, author and feminist campaigner
