= Ashley Hunter =

Ashley Hunter may refer to:

- Ashley Hunter (cartoonist) (1854–1932), New Zealand cartoonist and engineer
- Ashley Hunter (footballer) (born 1995), British footballer

== See also ==
- Ash Hunter, actor
