= Ashley Black =

Ashley Black may refer to:

- Ashley John Black, Australian judge
- Ashley Black (entrepreneur) (born 1972), inventor of the FasciaBlaster
- Ashley Nicole Black (born 1985), American comedian and writer
- Ashley Black, a contestant on America's Next Top Model season 5
