= Ashley Davis =

Ashley Davis may refer to:

- Ashley E. Davis (born 1975), American business executive and government official
- Ashley Davis, American military pilot, see 1996 Croatia USAF Boeing CT-43 crash
- Ashley Davis, winner of the 2010 Miss Alabama pageant

== See also ==
- Ashley Davies (disambiguation)
