= Growth attenuation =

Medical treatment to reduce child growth

Growth attenuation is an elective medical treatment which involves administering estrogen to cause closure of the epiphyses of the bones (Epiphyseal plates), resulting in a reduced adult height. Since the 1960s this treatment has been performed primarily on children growing toward an adult height considered unacceptably excessive by their parents and doctors. The cultural consensus of what is considered an excessive height justifying treatment has differed in Europe and North America and has risen over the last 4 decades.

Most of the children treated have been girls, with larger numbers treated in Europe than in North America. The height considered unacceptable by parents and doctors has become substantially taller over the last few decades. Very few boys have ever been treated for excessive tallness in North America, but this also has been done more often in Europe. Growth attenuation treatment has caused some controversy with news of the Ashley Treatment administered to a developmentally disabled girl. This has been criticised as denying the human rights of disabled people.
