= Ashley Robertson =

Ashley Robertson may refer to:

- Ashley Robertson (cricketer) (born 1972), Australian former cricketer
- Ashley Robertson (singer), country music singer
