= Gail Miller (businesswoman) =

American businesswoman (born 1943)

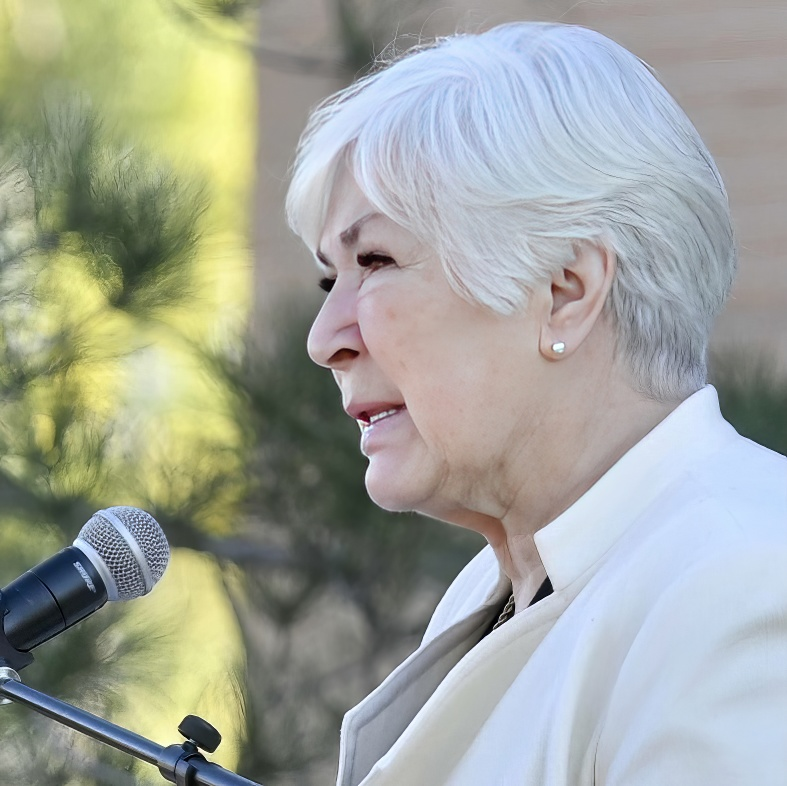
- Miller in 2022
- Born: Karen Gail Saxton; October 14, 1943 (age 83); Salt Lake City, Utah, U.S.
- Occupations: Chair of the Larry H. Miller Company; Owner of Real Salt Lake
- Spouse: Larry H. Miller (m. 1965; died 2009) Kim Wilson (m. 2013)
- Children: 5

Karen Gail Miller (née Saxton; born October 14, 1943) is an American businesswoman who is the head of the Larry H. Miller Company. She assumed the role upon the death of her husband Larry H. Miller in 2009. From 2009 until 2020, Miller was the owner of the Utah Jazz of the National Basketball Association (NBA). She acquired Real Salt Lake of Major League Soccer (MLS) in 2025. Miller engages in philanthropy through her family foundation.

== Family and personal life ==
Miller was born in Salt Lake City, Utah, on October 14, 1943. Her father was a shoemaker, and her mother a housekeeper. Her family was impoverished and at one time had only one lightbulb, which they moved from room to room.

Miller is descended from pioneers who were among the first whites to settle in Utah. One of Miller's great-great-grandfathers was Johan Otte. Otte was born in Prussia in 1843. He met his wife, Ane Sorensdatter, in Denmark. Ane died giving birth to Ane Maria. Ane Maria was taken in by close friends of the couple due to Otte's grief. These friends had recently joined the Church of Jesus Christ of Latter-day Saints (LDS Church) and took Ane Maria with them to Utah. Otte went on to have seven more children with a later wife. One of those children was Hans Frederick Otte, Miller's grandfather. Johan Otte converted to the LDS Church in Denmark and moved to Utah in 1898. He died later that year, but only after being reunited with his daughter and the friends who had taken her in as their own.

She married Larry H. Miller on March 25, 1965. They had five children together. Larry died of diabetes complications on February 20, 2009. Miller married her second husband, Salt Lake City attorney Kim Wilson, in June 2013.

== Business ==
After her husband died in 2009, Miller assumed control of their businesses, which then consisted of 54 car dealerships, a movie theater chain, and the Utah Jazz. One of Miller's first moves after taking over was to create a board of directors, a move that was initially resisted by other stakeholders. Miller says she suffered from imposter syndrome when she first started work. She went on to direct the sale of the auto business and the Utah Jazz along with the expansion into real estate and healthcare. From 2009 to 2025, the company doubled both its headcount and revenue.

As of 2022, many of these assets have been sold and the company has expanded into new businesses, such as real estate and healthcare.

As of 2023, LHMCO's board was chaired by Steve Miller, the Millers' third son.

=== Sports and entertainment ===
In May 2024, the Larry H. Miller Company rebranded its sports and entertainment businesses, including the Salt Lake Bees and their ballpark in Daybreak, Big League Utah, Larry H. Miller Megaplex Theatres, and Larry H. Miller Megaplex Entertainment, as Miller Sports + Entertainment.

==== Utah Jazz ====
The Miller family started construction on the Delta Center, which would later become the Vivint Arena, in 1990. It was completed in 1991. The arena has been an economic boon for downtown Salt Lake City. It attracted large amounts of foot traffic and many businesses have been established nearby.

Gail Miller assumed ownership upon her husband's death. In 2017, she transferred ownership of the Jazz and Vivint Arena into a trust to keep the franchise in Utah for generations. The Millers are often credited with saving the team and keeping it in Utah when the franchise was experiencing financial problems in the 1980s.

In 2017, the Miller family spent $125 million renovating the Vivint Arena. In 2019, a fan verbally abused NBA player Russell Westbrook. Miller later addressed the home crowd to speak out against the boorish behavior and proclaimed, "This should never happen. We are not a racist community." In 2020, Jazz player Rudy Gobert donated $200,000 to team employees who were furloughed due to the COVID-19 pandemic. Miller announced that the LHM Group would "more than match" this number.

In October 2020, the Miller family agreed to sell the Jazz and Vivint Arena to Ryan Smith, founder of Qualtrics, for $1.66 billion. This price is about 70 times what the Miller family originally paid. Smith had a long-standing interest in the team. He even sponsored a jersey patch that raised $25 million for charity. Smith made proposals to the Miller family on several occasions before finally reaching acceptable terms. The deal requires the team to remain in Utah The Miller family retained a minority interest. The Salt Lake City Stars of the NBA G League and management of the Salt Lake Bees minor league baseball team were also part of the deal. The Miller family said they planned to use the profits from this sale to diversify their businesses and engage in more extensive philanthropy. The Millers rejected previous offers to buy the Jazz.

In 2022, the Miller family announced that it was selling a portion of its remaining interest in the Utah Jazz. The transaction placed a value of $2.25 billion on the Jazz. The transaction was the result of an agreement made when the Millers sold their majority interest in the team.

==== Big League Utah ====
In early 2023, Miller, her family, and the LHM Company started an effort to bring a Major League Baseball (MLB) team to Salt Lake City. This has been called the "Big League Utah" campaign. A "shovel ready" site in the Rocky Mountain Power District in west Salt Lake City has been identified to build a stadium. This site was selected because of its position between the airport and downtown.

Miller's late husband, who died in 2009, spent a whole chapter of his autobiography on his love of ballparks, baseball, and softball. Miller described her efforts to bring MLB to Utah as extremely important to her and to her family.

In early 2023, the LHMCO purchased billboards reading "Utah wants the A's" around Salt Lake City while representatives of the team were visiting to meet with the company. LHMCO made an effort to get the A's to temporarily relocate to Utah while waiting for the completion of their new stadium in Las Vegas.

In 2023, the Larry H. Miller Company's real estate subsidiary purchased a 12-acre site near the proposed stadium. It was previously owned by ABF Freight, a shipping and logistics company. LHMCO expressed interest in buying the former Ramada Inn near the proposed baseball stadium. If LHMCO were to close on this property, it would then have control of 18 acres of land near the stadium. These sites are part of the small amount of privately controlled land in the area not owned by Rocky Mountain Power.

In late 2023, Big League Utah announced the formation of honorary and community advisory boards. The honorary board includes Gail Miller, Gov. Spencer Cox, and Salt Lake City Mayor Erin Mendenhall. Zions Bank President Scott Anderson, Vivint Smart Home founder Todd Pedersen, and Salt Lake Chamber CEO Derek Miller sit on the community advisory board. In the same announcement, Big League Utah said that it would form a foundation to address the needs of the people and businesses that occupy the area near the proposed stadium.

In February 2024, the Larry H. Miller Company announced plans to invest $3.5 billion to develop the Power District. The firm released renderings of the proposed development. The plans include a stadium intended for Major League Baseball. LHMCO worked closely with the Utah State Fairpark board, Salt Lake City, the Jordan River Commission, and other policymakers to ensure compliance with land use planning.

In early 2024, the Utah state legislature passed HB 562. This bill pledges $900 million for the proposed Major League Baseball stadium. The Larry H. Miller Company would be obligated to invest another $900 million.

In early 2026, the Larry H. Miller Company announced plans to improve a section of the Jordan River that runs through the Power District. The plan calls for reintroducing native vegetation and aquatic animals, improving water quality, and adding a riverwalk. Field Operations, a landscape architecture firm, was hired for the project. The firm has worked on similar projects such as New York City's High Line, Seattle's Waterfront, and San Francisco's Presidio Tunnel Tops.

==== Salt Lake Bees ====
This franchise dates from 1994, when Joe Buzas, a former major league player and the owner of the PCL Portland Beavers, moved the team to Salt Lake City. Buzas made a deal wherein the city would build a new ballpark on the site of historic Derks Field in exchange for relocating the team. The new ballpark, Franklin Quest Field, opened in 1994 with the renamed Salt Lake Buzz drawing 713,224 fans to home games during their inaugural season—breaking the PCL single-season attendance record that had stood for 48 years. Buzas owned the team until his death in 2003. The team was purchased by Larry H. Miller, who also owned the NBA's Utah Jazz. Known as the Salt Lake Buzz from 1994 to 2000, the team changed its name to the Salt Lake Stingers in 2001. The change was forced by a trademark dilution lawsuit filed by Georgia Tech, whose yellowjacket mascot is named Buzz.

==== Professional soccer ====
In April 2025, she acquired a controlling interest in Real Salt Lake of Major League Soccer (MLS), the Utah Royals of the National Women's Soccer League (NWSL), and America First Field from David Blitzer and Ryan Smith for $600 million.

==== Megaplex Theatres ====
Megaplex Theatres is a cinema chain based in Sandy, Utah. It was founded in 1999 and is owned by The Larry H. Miller Company. As of 2024, Megaplex Theatres operated 17 locations. The first location anchored the newly built Jordan Commons restaurant and entertainment complex in Sandy when it opened on November 1, 1999, with 20 screens. The theater was built on the former site of Jordan High School. Since its opening, the Sandy location has grown to be one of the highest-grossing theaters locally while also ranking among the top theaters nationwide on some films.

=== Health care ===
The LHM Company expanded its healthcare business into skilled nursing, assisted living, home health, and hospice care and has formed LHM Senior Health.

In January 2021, the LHM Group announced its purchase of Advanced Health Care (AHC), a chain of high-end nursing homes and hospices that also provides in-home health care. AHC patients are generally transitioning from in-hospital acute care to living at home. The purchase price was undisclosed. The LHM Group said the acquisition was part of a broader effort to diversify their portfolio of businesses. AHC was founded in Idaho in 2001 and runs 22 facilities, including six in Utah. The other facilities are in Arizona, California, Colorado, Idaho, Kansas, Nevada, and New Mexico. The deal was finalized after two years of negotiations. This was LHM Group's first acquisition in health care. The Larry H. Miller Company took over tasks such as accounting, real-estate management, and future redevelopment so that AHC can focus on its core competencies. AHC was founded by Lehi-native Brett Nattress, a general authority for the Church of Jesus Christ of Latter-day Saints. In 2023, AHC announced acquisitions in both Cleveland and Cincinnati.

The facility formerly known as the Harmony Hills Assisted Living Center in Lehi, Utah was purchased by AHC in 2022. As of early 2023, the facility was undergoing renovations and re-opened in May 2023. The renovation includes a large salt-water fish tank, a new gym, a new hair salon, and a new library. The facility was renamed the Aspen Ridge Residences. It will be AHC's first assisted living center. Studio and one-bedroom apartments will be on offer. The Aspen Ridge Residences were open as of 21 June 2023.

In early 2025, the Miller family foundation partnered with Proxima to help people facing barriers to entering healthcare careers receive proper training.

=== Real estate ===
In 2021, the LHM Group's real estate subsidiary acquired the remaining 1,300 acres of undeveloped land and numerous buildings in Daybreak, a mixed-use development in South Jordan in Salt Lake County. It was acquired from Varde Partners. The LHM Group plans to build approximately 6,000 additional homes in Daybreak.

In early 2022, LHM Group announced that its real estate division had acquired builder Destination Homes. LHM planned to retain the Destination Homes name and its staff.

In March 2022, it was reported that LLCs controlled by LHM Real Estate had purchased 950 acres in Richardson Flat in unincorporated Summit County. In early 2024, The Larry H. Miller Company made an offer to build affordable housing on its holdings in Richardson Flat.

Park City annexed the eastern half of LHMCO's holdings in Richardson Flat. A subsidiary of LHMCO sued to stop the annexation but failed to prevail in court. Hideout attempted a similar annexation. As of early 2024, the case had been heard by the Utah Supreme Court but no decision had been rendered.

In 2026, LHMCO sold 14 acres of land to University of Utah Health for medical facility. Under the agreement, the University of Utah Health will be exclusive healthcare provider in the Power District.

=== Energy ===
In April 2024, LHMCO announced that it had invested in ATTYX. ATTYX is based in Lehi, Utah. It sells and installs windows, roofing, insulation, HVAC, and solar panels. The firm has a special emphasis on energy efficiency.

In April 2024, Torus announced that it had received an investment from the Larry H. Miller Company. Torus is based in Lehi, Utah. It designs and manufactures energy management and storage systems.

=== Recyclops ===
On June 17, 2022, the LHM Company announced that it was investing an undisclosed sum in Recyclops, a Utah start-up company that recycles materials such as polystyrene, film, batteries, lightbulbs, and textiles that are difficult to handle and serves often neglected rural areas. Recyclops operates on a subscription model. Recyclops was founded in 2014. As of 2022, it operated in 18 states.

Recyclops started by servicing apartment buildings and then shifted its focus to single-family houses in cities lacking recycling facilities and programs. The company uses a gig-worker model that relies upon independent contractors to catalyze its growth.

In mid-2022, Recylops expanded service in Kentucky to Bowling Green and Warren County. The same year, Recylops expanded into Minnesota's Aitkin County.

In 2023, Recyclops received B Corp certification from B Lab.

As of 2024, Recyclops had expanded to at least 30 states.

Recyclops generally takes anything that can be recycled to the nearest metro area with a recycling program. The company aims to reduce greenhouse gas emissions by avoiding the use of garbage trucks. They also claim their vehicles do dramatically less damage to roads than garbage trucks. They partner with businesses to dispose of items that are difficult to recycle. These include things like the insulated liners that come with cold food and diapers.

As of 2024, Recyclops focused its business on two areas: serving residences in rural areas and providing business-to-business waste disposal. The company's enterprise services have a heavy emphasis on food services.

=== Car dealerships ===
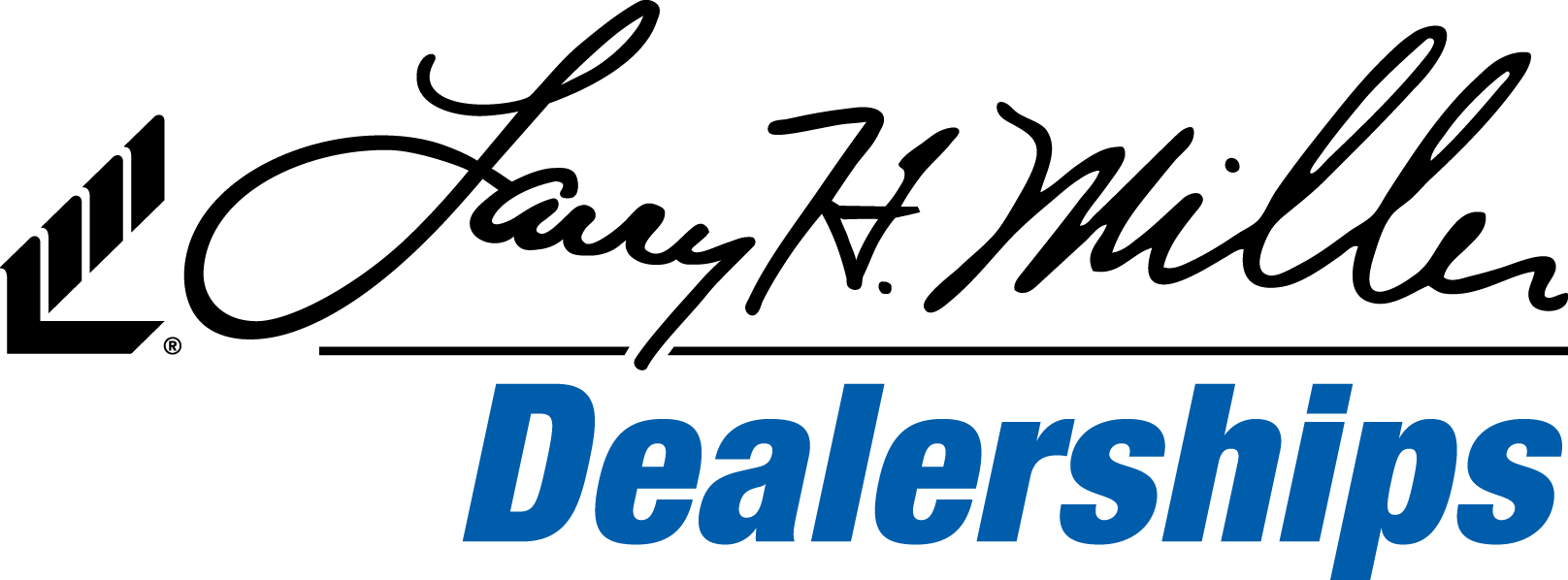
LHM

The Millers acquired and renamed a Toyota dealership in 1979. Miller and her husband built a chain of car dealerships. These dealerships produced estimated sales of about $5.4 billion in 2019.

In September 2021, Asbury Automotive announced it would purchase LHM Group's car dealerships for about $3.2 billion. This price included $740 million for real estate. The dealerships will retain the LHM branding. Corwin Auto Group of North Dakota purchased LHM Liberty Toyota and the LHM Toyota dealership in Boulder, Colorado.

While under Miller family ownership, their car dealerships started an annual food drive to benefit local food banks.

=== Swig ===
In late 2022, the LHM Company acquired a majority stake in Swig. Savory Fund, along with Swig founder Nicole Tanner and partners Chase Wardrop and Dylan Roede, maintained a substantial minority equity stake in the chain. In 2023, Swig revealed its plans to open 25 corporate-owned locations and launch a franchising program. Additionally, Megaplex Theatres was set to start selling Swig products the same year. Swig opened its 50th location in Prosper, Texas, in April 2023, with a day-long celebration that included a 50% discount on all items. In August 2023, Swig announced that it planned to open 250 locations in Florida, North Carolina, South Carolina, Tennessee, Arkansas, Missouri, and Idaho. The new locations will be operated by 12 franchisees.

== Philanthropy ==
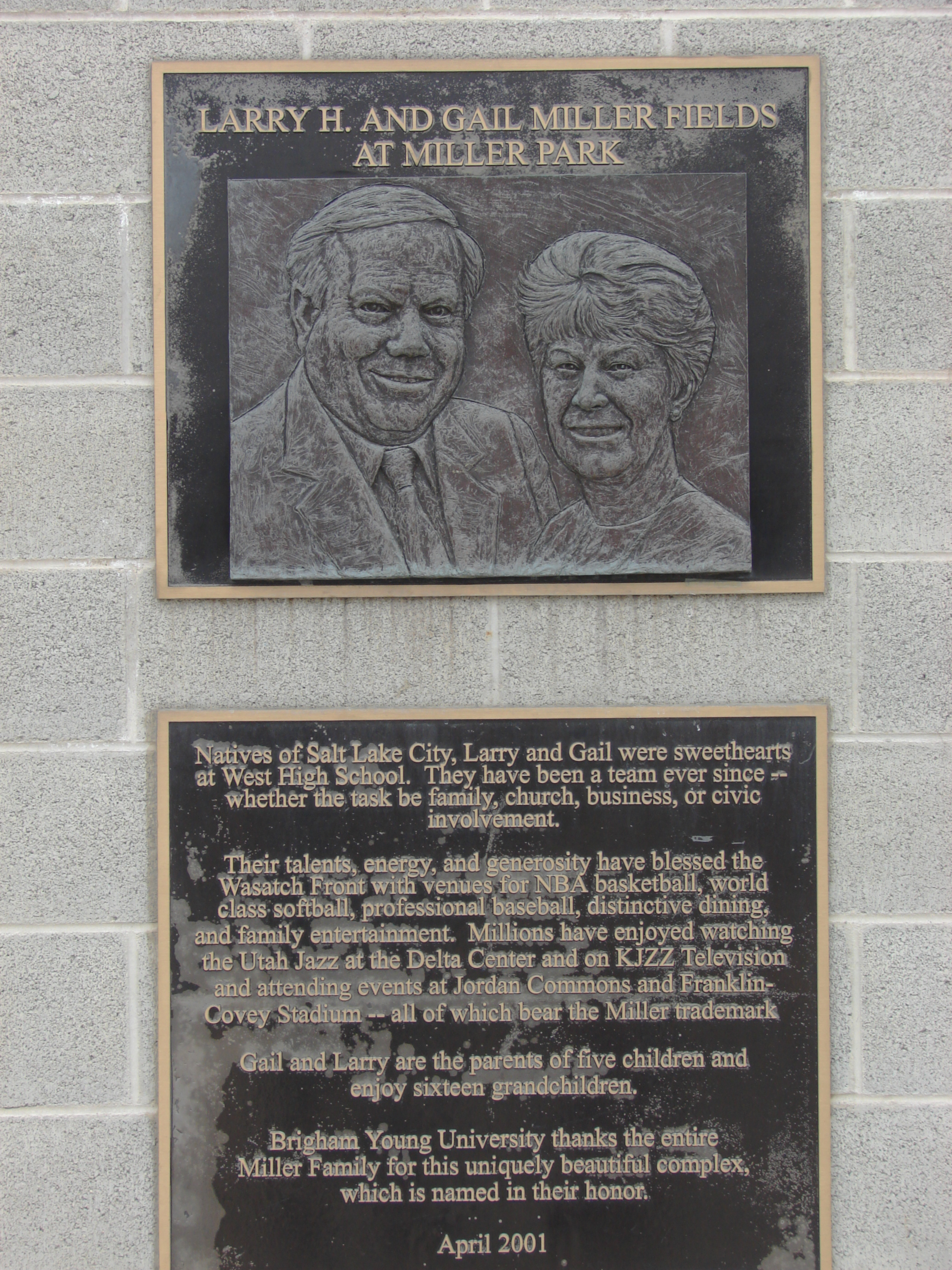
Plaque at Miller Park--BYU

In 2007, Miller and her husband established the Larry H. & Gail Miller Family Foundation.

In 2019, it was reported that Miller set up a process for young family members, starting at age 12, to participate in philanthropy. They may select registered non-profit organizations and prepare proposals to support them for submission to the family foundation's board.

=== Education ===
In 2000, Brigham Young University (BYU) announced that the Millers had made a significant financial contribution towards the new 4,000-seat, $7 million baseball and softball complex. Built on campus, the project was named Miller Park, and the softball field was christened Gail Miller Field, and the baseball field is called Larry H. Miller Field.

Starting in 2002, the Miller family has supported the Larry H. and Gail Miller Enrichment Scholarship. As of 2022, this support has totaled roughly $13 million.

In 2007, Miller and her husband founded the Driven 2 Teach program. This program, which is also funded by Zions Bank, takes primary and secondary school history teachers on trips to historic sites throughout the United States.

Miller supported a state law in Utah to provide menstruation products to students free of charge. She donated $50,000 to SisterGoods, a group working on this issue. In early 2022, the Miller family foundation agreed to fund the distribution of period products in public schools, in partnership with the Andrus Family Foundation.

In March 2022, the Miller family donated $2.1 million from their foundation to Southern Utah University (SUU) to support its Entrepreneurship Center. This donation was a matching grant. The foundation has donated a total of $3.6 million to the Entrepreneurship Program.

In 2022, the Miller family donated $3 million to endow a directorship at the Utah Valley University Center for Constitutional Studies. Among other projects, the center offers education on the United States Constitution to the university as well as primary and secondary schools in Utah.

Miller donated $500,000 to create centers to help homeless students in public schools. Miller donated another $1 million dedicated to such centers in the Davis School District the same year.

In 2022, through her foundation, Miller donated $3.5 million to open the Miller Advanced Research and Solutions Center (MARS). MARS is a center at Weber State University that conducts national defense research with student participation. It is located near Hill Air Force Base. The new Missile and Energy Research Center is located in the same building as MARS.

Miller sits on the board of trustees as an emeritus member at Salt Lake Community College (SLCC). She has been a major donor to the school for decades. In 2022, Miller and her family foundation donated $10 million to SLCC. The donation will improve the building that houses the business school, now known as the Larry H. & Gail Miller Family Business Building. The business school is now known as the Gail Miller School of Business. This is the only business school in Utah named after a woman and one of only a few in the entire United States.

As of 2024, the Sterling Scholar program was sponsored by the Larry H. & Gail Miller Family Foundation. The program awards scholarships to outstanding high-school seniors.

In 2024, reports said Miller donated $2.5 million to the Huntsman School of Business at Utah State University through her family foundation.

In 2024, the Miller family foundation donated $1 million to Ogden-Weber Technical College to fund construction of its Pathway Building. The building will house classrooms and space for student services.

In late 2025, the Miller family foundation provided partial funding to a Salt Lake City School District program that provides internet access to underprivileged students in the form of T-Mobile hotspots. The program is designed to help students complete school work and stay connected with their classmates.

=== Health and social services ===
In 2019, the Gail Miller Resource Center, dedicated to helping the homeless, opened in Salt Lake City.

Miller donated $50 million to Intermountain Healthcare (IHC), a non-profit group of hospitals and clinics that serves children in Utah, Wyoming, Montana, Idaho, Nevada, and Alaska. This donation was the start of a $500 million fundraising campaign. Miller has served as a member of IHC's board of trustees since 2013 and its chair since 2018. She has since resigned as chair.

In late 2020, Miller decided to sell her late husband's coin collection, worth about $25 million, and donate the proceeds to Intermountain Health. The donation was used to build a second campus for the Primary Children's Hospital in Lehi.

Miller donated $50 million towards the construction of the second Primary Children's Hospital campus in Lehi. The campus was named in honor of her family. The hospital plans to start accepting patients in February 2024. The 38-acre Lehi location is formally referred to as the Larry H. and Gail Miller Family Campus.

In 2022, Miller donated $5 million to the Utah Housing Preservation Fund to preserve older housing and affordable housing for renovation for future tenants.

Miller's foundation and other organizations such as the Huntsman Family Foundation and Zions Bank donated $2 million to the Utah Community Foundation to support victims of Russia's invasion of Ukraine in 2022. Retail locations controlled by LHM Group accepted in-kind donations.

For Thanksgiving in 2022, the Larry H. and Gail Miller Family Foundation, the LHM Company, and local governments worked together with non-profits to provide about 3,000 meals and many other services at the [Salt Palace|Salt Palace Convention Center]. This was the 24th-straight year the Miller family has helped to provide Thanksgiving meals to the homeless and those experiencing food insecurity. In addition, participants were given vaccinations for the flu and COVID-19, diabetes testing, free feminine hygiene products, dental cleanings, clothes, legal help, free public transit passes, and free bicycle repairs.

In 2023, Miller donated $250,000 through her foundation to help build a transitional housing facility in Ogden, Utah. The shelter is designed for the benefit of victims of domestic violence.

As of 2023, the Miller family and the Larry H. Miller Company had worked with other organizations to serve thousands of Thanksgiving dinners to the homeless and hungry for 25 years straight. In 2023, the event also included dental cleanings, hygiene kits, mental health counseling, bicycle repair, etc.

In 2023, the Miller family foundation donated $3.5 million to the Huntsman Mental Health Foundation.

As of early 2024, the Larry H. & Gail Miller Family Foundation was a major donor to the Utah Impact Partnership. The Utah Impact Partnership is primarily aimed at fighting homelessness.

In January 2024, the Utah Food Bank opened a new distribution center in Springville that was partially funded by a donation from the Miller family foundation.

Miller sits on the board of Shelter the Homeless.

In 2024, Miller, through her family foundation, made a matching grant of $850,000 to Southern Utah University to fund mental health services.

Miller is a co-founder and board member of the Utah Impact Partnership.

The Miller family foundation donated to support the construction of transitional housing for victims of domestic and sexual violence in Ogden, Utah. The housing is operated by the YCC Family Crisis Center.

The Larry H. and Gail Miller Family Foundation launched the Westside Community Grant Initiative in 2024 to fund nonprofit organizations on the west side of Salt Lake City, where Gail Miller grew up. The area has significant Latino, Pacific Islander, and refugee populations and has seen rising housing costs due to redevelopment. Life expectancy there has been reported as nearly ten years lower than east of Interstate 15. According to the foundation, the initiative had granted more than $1 million to seventy-five organizations as of 2026, including Club Ability, which offers free technology education, and Comunidad Materna, which provides care to low-income Spanish-speaking mothers.

The Miller family foundation donated $1 million to support the expansion and improvement of the Fairpark Deeply Affordable and Permanently Supportive Housing project operated by Switchpoint. This project is focused on homeless veterans and the elderly. It is located in Salt Lake City.

The Miller family foundation set up the Westside Community Grant program in late 2024 to assist non-profits offering social services on Salt Lake City's west side. The foundation's initial funding totaled $500,000. As of late 2024, NeighborWorks, University Neighborhood Partners, Comunidad Materna, and the Pacific Heritage Academy have all received grants.

In 2025, the Miller family foundation donated to support the renovation of the Oneida Stake Academy.

In late 2025, the Miller family foundation donated $100,000 for flood relief in the Salt Lake City area. Larry H. Miller Real Estate donated an additional $25,000.

In late 2025, Miller donated $10 million to Shelter the Homeless through her foundation. Shelter the Homeless runs six homeless shelters. Miller's donation will be used to partially fund and endowment that will pay to maintain and improve the shelters.

=== LDS Church ===
Miller's late husband provided initial funding for a team of experts at BYU that examined documents from the early history of the LDS Church. This team later compiled The Joseph Smith Papers, intended as a comprehensive examination of documents created by or at the direction of the church's founder Joseph Smith (1805–1844). In addition to the books with Smith's papers, the project generated a companion television series. Miller funded this project with a donation of $10 million in bonds and additional cash contributions. The project published its 27th and final volume in 2023. Miller continued her husband's financial support of the Joseph Smith Papers.

=== Sports and recreation ===
Through her family foundation, Miller donated $5 million for the renovation of a softball facility at Big Cottonwood Regional Park, which has since been renamed the LHM Softball Complex.

Miller donated $4 million through her family foundation to renovate the Larry H. Miller Softball Complex at Valley Regional Park in Salt Lake County. The donation enabled improvements to the field, stands, and other amenities, including the drainage system. The project was completed in cooperation with Salt Lake County Parks and Recreation.

In late 2023, the Miller family foundation funded renovations to baseball fields at Riverside Park in partnership with Salt Lake City.

In early 2024, the Miller family foundation announced a $22 million donation to Salt Lake City's Ballpark NEXT fund. This fund, managed by the Salt Lake City Council, is conducting a $100-million program to improve the neighborhood including and surrounding Smith's Ballpark.

In February 2024, the Miller family foundation announced a $2.2 million donation to support water conservation efforts through the Antelope Island Learning Center. The related efforts, including renovation of the learning center and the addition of a theater, are being coordinated with the Utah Department of Natural Resources and Utah Water Ways.

In late 2024, the Miller family foundation announced a donation of $25 million to Salt Lake County to fund a regional arts center to be constructed in South Jordan. The Larry H. Miller Company donated three acres of land for the project through its real estate subsidiary. Plans for the center include a large theater, other event spaces, classrooms, and an art gallery. The Salt Lake County Arts and Culture division will operate the center.

In 2025, the Miller family foundation announced a $500,000 donation to help the St. George Music Theater build its own venue.

In 2025, the Miller family foundation announced a $1 million donation to the Museum of Utah.

In 2025, the Miller family foundation announced a $2 million donation to build a replacement for the Alta Canyon Sports Center in Sandy. The new facility is scheduled to open in 2027. The donation supplements support from Sandy and Salt Lake County.

In 2026, the Miller family foundation announced a $10 million donation to support renewing the Great Salt Lake, which has lost about half of its water by volume since its peak. This funding will go to purchase rights to water which will be allowed to flow to the lake.

In June 2026, LHMCO, the Miller family foundation, and the Daniels Fund announced the Utah Youth Sports Giving Day, a fundraising campaign to support affordable access to youth sports.

=== Veterans ===
As of 2023, Miller, through her foundation, provided financial support for Utah Honor Flight. This group provides free trips to war memorials for veterans.

=== Voting ===
Miller is the founder of Count My Vote, a non-profit organization dedicated to encouraging voting.

=== Redemption Bank ===
In 2025, Redemption Holding Company completed its purchase of Utah-based Holladay Bank and Trust which was renamed Redemption Bank. The sale helped establish America's 24th black-owned financial institution. This was the first black-led purchase of a non-minority owned bank in American history. The Larry H. & Gail Miller Family Foundation was part of the consortium of investors that funded the acquisition.

== Recognition ==
In 2012, Miller was recognized with the ATHENA International Award. The award is sponsored by Wells Fargo and presented by the Salt Lake Chamber.

In 2015, Miller received the "Giant in our City" award. This award is generally regarded as the most prestigious business award in Utah. It is presented by the Salt Lake Chamber.

In 2017, Miller received an honorary doctorate from the University of Utah.

In 2019, the Joint Leadership Commission of the Congressional Award Foundation and its board of directors presented Miller the Horizon Award in a ceremony on Capitol Hill in Washington, D.C. recognizing her work in the community and with young people.

In 2019, Miller was named "Utahn of the Year" by The Salt Lake Tribune.

In early 2020, Miller was one of the recipients recognized via Ford's Salute to Dealers awards. The award was given in recognition of Miller's community service and philanthropy. Ford specifically mentioned the LHM Group's Larry H. Miller Day of Service that helps employees donating thousands of hours to helping the homeless, at-risk youth, families of severely ill children, and victims of domestic abuse.

In late 2023, Miller was awarded the first ever NewsMakers award in recognition of her community service at an event hosted by the Salt Lake Tribune.

In April 2024, Miller was named "Pillar of the Valley" by the Utah Valley Chamber of Commerce.

In June 2024, Miller was inducted to the David Eccles School of Business Hall of Fame. The David Eccles School of Business is part of the University of Utah.

In late 2024, the Larry H. & Gail Miller Family Foundation received the Haven J. Barlow Legacy Award from Davis Technical College.

In 2024, Deseret News named Miller one of the "10 influential women in Utah history."

In early 2026, Miller carried the Olympic torch through downtown Milan.

== Politics ==
In 2013, Miller partnered with former Utah Governor Mike Leavitt and former First Lady Norma Matheson to create "Count My Vote," a bipartisan effort to push for state electoral reform.

In 2020, Miller, along with many other business leaders, endorsed the Republican gubernatorial campaign of Spencer Cox.

== Boards ==
Miller serves on boards of Zions Bancorporation, Intermountain Health, and the Utah Homeless Council.

Sporting positions
Preceded by Larry H. Miller	Utah Jazz principal owner 2009–2020	Succeeded by Ryan Smith
