= Ashley Brown (disambiguation) =

Ashley Brown (born 1982) is an American singer and actress.

Ashley Brown may also refer to:

- Ashley Brown (soccer) (born 1994), Australian footballer
- Samuel Ashley Brown (1923–2011), American professor
- Ashley Brown, British model who appeared on Britain's Next Top Model series 5

== See also ==
- Ashley Smith-Brown (born 1996), English footballer
- Alfred Ashley-Brown (1915–1993), Australian politician
- William Ashley-Brown (1887–1970), Australian Anglican priest
