= Ashley Grimes =

Ashley Grimes may refer to:

- Ashley Grimes (footballer, born 1957), Irish footballer
- Ashley Grimes (footballer, born 1986), English footballer
