= Ashley Young (disambiguation) =

Ashley Young (born 1985) is an English footballer.

Ashley Young may also refer to:

- Ashley Young (Miss North Dakota), see Miss America 2008
- Ashley Young (footballer, born 1990), see List of Scottish football transfers 2008–09
- Ashley Young (water polo), represented United States at the 2013 Summer Universiade
