= Ashley Hall =

Ashley Hall may refer to:

- Ashley Hall, Cheshire, a country house in England
- Ashley Hall (Charleston, South Carolina), a school in the U.S.
- Ashley Hall, Lancashire, a country house in England
- Ashley Hall (musician) (born 1959), an American musician
- Ashley Hall (golfer) (born 1983), Australian professional golfer

== See also ==
- Ashleigh Hall (died 2009), murder victim of Peter Chapman
