= Ashley T. Johnson =

American FBI official

Ashley T. Johnson is an American Federal Bureau of Investigation (FBI) official who has led the FBI's field office in St. Louis, Missouri since 2024. She is the first woman and first black woman to hold the position.

== Early life and education ==
Johnson was born to teachers Clinton and Barbara Johnson and was raised in Mobile, Alabama. As a child, she was inspired to pursue a career in law enforcement after watching Matlock. She studied education for the first year and a half of her studies at the University of South Alabama before transferring to criminal justice. She achieved her bachelor's degree there in addition to a master's degree in sociology with a concentration in criminology. After college, she spent three years as a probation officer for the Mobile County Drug Court before returning to school at the University of Alabama to receive her master's degree of social work in public policy and social welfare. Johnson then became a child abuse investigator and a psychiatric social worker.

== Career ==
Johnson joined the FBI in 2007, when she began working as a special agent investigating civil and white-collar crimes in New Orleans, Louisiana. She was encouraged to join the FBI by one of her grad school teachers, former Mobile police chief Sam Cochran. In 2011, Johnson was promoted to supervisory special agent in the Cyber Division. She moved to the Atlanta Division in 2013, where she would supervise the division's domestic terrorism squad. Johnson additionally was tasked with creating and sustaining an airport squad at Hartsfield–Jackson Atlanta International Airport in 2017. In 2018, she was appointed assistant special agent in charge of the Atlanta Division’s Criminal Branch. During her tenure, she established the Atlanta Development and Leadership Council "with the intent to create professional development opportunities for current and aspiring leaders". Johnson joined the Human Resources Division at the FBI's headquarters, the J. Edgar Hoover Building, in 2020. In 2024, she was appointed as the special agent in charge of the St. Louis Field Office by director Christopher A. Wray, becoming the first woman and first black woman to do so.
