= Ashley Williams =

Ashley Williams may refer to:

== People ==
- Ashley Williams (footballer) (born 1984), Wales international footballer
- Ashley Williams (Liberian footballer) (born 2000), Liberian footballer
- Ashley Williams (boxer) (born 1991), Welsh boxer
- Ashley Williams (actress) (born 1978), American actress
- Ashley Williams (designer) (born 1988/89), British fashion designer
- Ashley Williams (sprinter) (born 1996), Jamaican sprinter
- Winter Williams (born 1984), American actress, real name Ashley C. Williams
- Ashley Jaye Williams, multidisciplinary artist

== Characters ==
- Ashley Williams (Mass Effect), a character in the Mass Effect video game series
- Ash Williams (Ashley Joanna Williams), a character in the Evil Dead film series
