= Ashley Graham =

Ashley Graham may refer to:

- Ashley Graham (model) (born 1987), American model
- Ashley Graham (rugby league) (born 1984), Australian NRL player
- Ashley Graham (Resident Evil), a fictional character in the Resident Evil series
