= Ashley (restaurant) =

South Korean restaurant chain

- Industry: restaurants
- Founded: South Korea (2003)
- Headquarters: Seoul, South Korea
- Number of locations: 140+ stores (2014)
- Website: Official website

Ashley (Korean: 애슐리), is a restaurant chain based in South Korea owned by the E-Land. As of 2014, the chain had over 140 retail stores in South Korea. Ashley is a buffet which specializes in beef and steak.

Ashley consists of sub-brands that include general buffets like Ashley W, Ashley Queens, and Ashley Delivery, as well as more specialized stores like 83 Grill by Ashley. Depending on the type of restaurant and time of visit (lunch/dinner and weekday/weekend), pricing and food items vary.

As of December 2021, Ashley Queens and Queens Plus, which make up the majority of Ashley restaurants, both began contactless operations due to COVID-19. As part of the policy, diners must clean up their own dishes after dining. Some Ashley Queens Plus locations have also begun employing serving robots to help bus dishes in order to minimize contact in-store.

Ashley W, Ashley W+, Ashley Classic, and many other Ashley sub-brands closed down during the COVID-19 pandemic.

In December 2016, the Ministry of Employment and Labor revealed that part-time workers at Ashley were not paid their regular wages and other expected pay including non-duty allowance, overtime allowance and night duty allowance. This event led to extensive boycotting against the brand.

== Ashley Queens ==
Pricing (as of November 10, 2022)
	Weekday Lunch	Weekday Dinner	Weekends/Holidays
Adult (13+)	19,900 KRW	25,900 KRW	27,900 KRW
Elementary school students (7–12)	12,900 KRW	15,900 KRW	15,900 KRW
Children (0–5)	7,900 KRW	7,900 KRW	7,900 KRW

In December 2014, Ashley Queens, a higher-end buffet than the existing Ashley W+, opened in Apgujeong. The pricing was considered similar to other high-end buffets. At W and W+, menu items that were only available on weekends such as elaborate desserts, Chinese-style dishes, sushi, crepes and beef tartare were added as everyday items.

While pricing and menu items were different by location, they were standardized with the renewed opening of Ashley Queens in Sinchon. However, the 2001 Junggye location, Gangbyun location, Lotte Department Store Cheongnyangni location, and Happy Department Store Mokdong location offer weekday dinner for a lower price of 22,900 KRW. YouTuber Jin Yong-jin confirmed Ashley's claim that they discard all leftover food at the end of the day in a 2020 video.
