= Ashly Stohl =

American photographer

- Born: August 9, 1972 (age 52)
- Occupation: Photographer
- Website: www.ashlystohl.com

Ashly Stohl (born August 9, 1972) is an American photographer based in Los Angeles and New York City. She is the Publisher of Peanut Press, which she co-founded with photographer David Carol in 2014, and the author of numerous photography books.

== Biography ==
Stohl grew up in Los Angeles and attended UC Santa Barbara, where she earned a BS in chemistry. Prior to becoming a photographer, she designed award-winning educational websites for NASA's Mars Exploration Program.

Stohl is a self-taught photographer whose work documents her family and their relationships with each other. Her first book, Charth Vader, published in 2014, portrays the struggles of her youngest son as he navigates the world with a visual impairment. The profits from the book were donated to the Vision Center at Children's Hospital Los Angeles. Her second book, Days & Years, includes photographs of all three of her children and was published in 2019 in conjunction with her solo show at the Leica Gallery in SoHo. Stohl has lectured at various institutions such as Columbia University, George Washington University, SPE National, and the Penumbra Foundation.

== Books ==
- Charth Vader. Los Angeles, CA: Peanut Press, 2014.
- Days & Years. Los Angeles, CA: Peanut Press, 2019. With an introduction by Lynn Melnick.

== Collections ==
Stohl's work is held in multiple institutions' libraries and photography collections, including:

- International Center for Photography
- Museum of Fine Arts, Boston
- Virginia Museum of Fine Arts
- Cleveland Museum of Art
- Yale University
- Emory University
- Washington University in St. Louis
- University of Victoria
- College of William & Mary
