= Ashley Hart =

Ashley Hart may refer to:

- Ashley Hart (cricketer) (born 1956), New Zealand cricketer
- Ashley Hart (model) (born 1988), Australian model and yogi
