= Ashley Walters (artist) =

South African artist

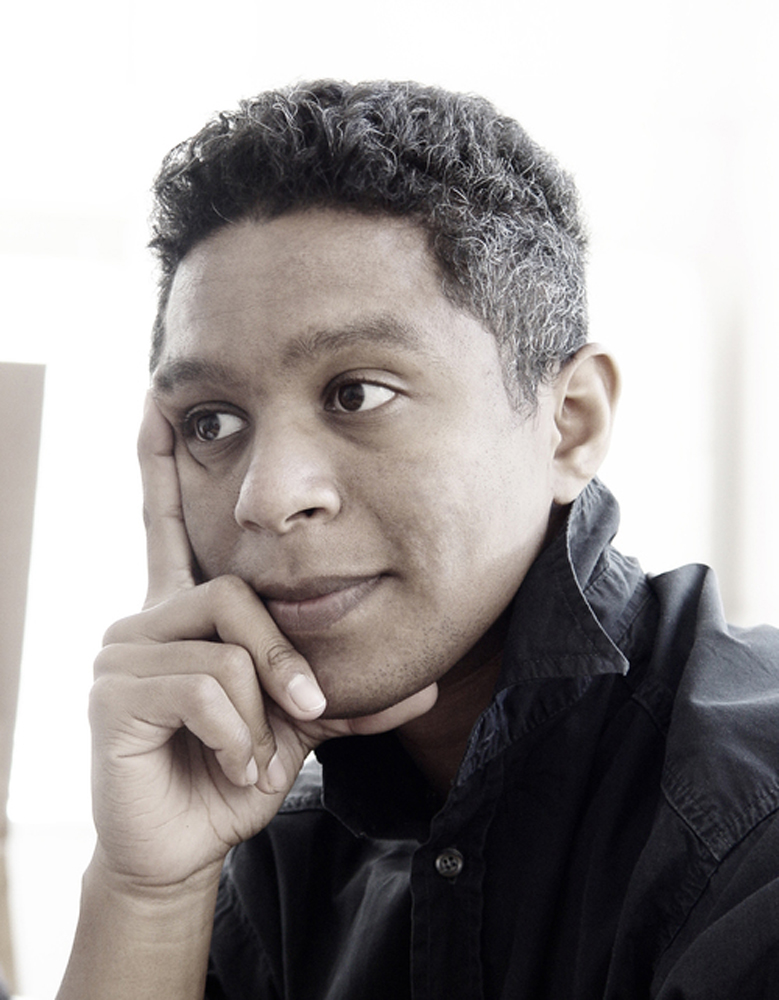
- Ashley Walters
- Born: 1983 (age 42–43); Uitsig, South Africa
- Occupation: Artist

Ashley Walters is a South African-born and based artist who works with photography and film.

== Life and work ==
Walters was born in 1983 in Uitsig, a suburb of Cape Town, six kilometers southeast of Cape Town International Airport.

During 1991 a family friend who happened to photograph local events introduced Walters to photography. In 1996 Walters received his first 35 mm compact film camera. Once Walters obtained a computer in high school, experimentation with digital image manipulation was possible.

Walters matriculated in 2000 from the technical St. Andrews High School before moving on to business in college. He gained a BA in Fine Art (2011) from the University of Cape Town's Michaelis School of Fine Art. Walters is currently undertaking the second year of an MA in Fine Art at Michaelis.

His work "Revolves around the mechanics of social ordering and explores relationships between social constructs and spatiality".

His projects have been Xray (2009), Fear (2009), Malawi (2010), Uitsig (2010) and Dark City (2011).

2013: Research Fellow: Centre for Curating the Archive, University of Cape Town.

== Publications ==
- 2011: BFA Grad Show, Catalogue. Michaelis Gallery, South Africa
- 2011: Media Release: Michaelis School of Fine Art Exhibition, Cape Town
- 2012: Sasol New Signatures, Exhibition Catalogue.
- 2012: Autobiography: Chronicle of Our Times. The 5th Cape Town Month of Photography Book. Ed. Jenny Altschuler.

== Exhibitions ==
- 2010: Infecting the City, Group Performance, Cape Town, South Africa
- 2010: States, Rosedale Gallery, Cape Town, South Africa
- 2010: States of Perception, San Francisco, USA
- 2011: Dark City, BFA Graduation Exhibition, Michaelis Galleries, Cape Town, South Africa.
- 2012: Art a Fares, Youngbloog, Cape Town, South Africa. Curated by Gavin Young
- 2012: Pop Up Exhibition, Allderman Gallery, Cape Town, South Africa
- 2012: Speke Photographic: Circa on Jellicoe, Everard Read Gallery, Johannesburg, South Africa.
- 2012: Speke Photographic: Exposure Now, Merchants on Long. Cape Town, South Africa
- 2012: Autobiography: Chronicles of Our Times, MOP5 Cape Town Month of Photography. The Allamans Barracks, Castle of Good Hope, Cape Town, South Africa
- 2012: Sasol New Signatures Exhibition, Pretoria, South Africa
- 2013: Platform_18_28, Infecting the City Public Arts Festival, Cape Town, South Africa
- 2013: Between the Lines, Michaelis Galleries, Cape Town. Curated by Nadja Daehnke in association with The German-South African Year of Science 2012/2013

== Awards ==
- 2009: David Marais Memorial Prize (University of Cape Town)
- 2010: Cecil Skotness Scholarship (University of Cape Town)
- 2011: Hayden Lubisi Scholarship (University of Cape Town)
- 2011: Simon Gerson Prize (University of Cape Town)
- 2011: The Michaelis Prize (University of Cape Town)
- 2012: Mentor of the Year, Student Wellness (University of Cape Town)
- 2012: NRF University Research Scholarship (University of Cape Town)
- 2012: Sasol New Signatures, South Africa (finalist)
- 2013: CCA Scholarship (University of Cape Town)
- 2013: National Arts Council of South Africa, Visual Arts
- 2013: Katrine Harries Print Cabinet Award.
