= Ashley Lawrence (disambiguation) =

Ashley Lawrence (born 1995), is a Canadian soccer player.

Ashley Lawrence or Laurence may also refer to:

- Ashley Lawrence (musician) (1934–1990), New Zealand conductor
- Ashley Lawrence (American Pie), fictional character
- Ashley Laurence (born 1966), American actress
