= Ashleigh Whitfield =

Ashleigh Whitfield (born 15 March 1980) is a British continuity announcer for BBC One and BBC Two, employed by BBC and based at Media City in Manchester and Broadcast Centre in White City, London.

Whitfield was born in Newcastle upon Tyne and after completing a degree in Media & Cultural Studies at the University of Sunderland, won a competition to become a traffic and travel presenter at Century Radio (now Real Radio, Gateshead) in 2001.

After a brief stint at Trafficlink, Birmingham, Whitfield became the weekend overnight presenter at Metro Radio and then the afternoon drive presenter on Magic 1152 in 2002. She went on to broadcast on the Magic Network across the north before making a move to the Breakfast Show at 103.4 Sun FM in 2004, where she co-hosted for two years along with Simon Grundy.

In 2006, Whitfield became the lunchtime presenter at 103.4 Sun FM and also presented a weekend show at TFM Radio. Other voiceover works included Cineworld Sunderland, Instore Radio Productions (Dalton Park, Furniture to Go and Wynsors World of Shoes) and recording the University of Sunderland podcasts for their website.

In January 2009, Whitfield moved to London to become a continuity announcer for BBC One and BBC Two. She was also heard on BBC Three and BBC HD. Whitfield was one of the last voices to be heard on BBC Three before it closed down but has resumed her role as a channel voice now the channel is back on air.

In September 2013, Whitfield returned to 103.4 Sun FM to present the weekend evening shows. She also presents the showbiz segments during the station's breakfast show and throughout the day.

In December 2025, Ashleigh started presenting the Sunday mid-morning show on Blue Sky Radio across Staffordshire and Cheshire. She is still a continuity announcer but is now based in the North East commuting to Media City in Salford for continuity shifts.

She is an ambassador for the British Tinnutis Association.

To date, she has carried out voice over work for Asda, NHS, Early Learning Centre, Calendar Club, Phuket FM, Music Radio Creative, Open University, Espresso Education, Barclays, British Airways, NTwine and The Perfume Shop sponsor for Blind Date. She is also Founding Editor of luxury lifestyle websites Luxe Bible. and the more recently launched Luxe Bible Newcastle.
