= Ashley Morris =

Ashley Morris may refer to:

- Ashley Morris (blogger) (1963–2008), New Orleans cultural and political blogger, professor of computer science
- Ashley Austin Morris (born 1983), American actress and comedian
- Ashley Morris (speedway rider) (born 1994), British speedway rider
- Ashley Diana Morris (born 1988), Canadian model and actress
- Ashley Morris, chief executive officer Capriotti's
