= Ashley Cain =

Ashley Cain may refer to:

- Ashley Cain (figure skater) (born 1995), American figure skater
- Ashley Cain (footballer) (born 1990), English footballer and reality TV personality
