= Ashley McKenzie (disambiguation) =

Ashley McKenzie (born 1989) is an English judoka.

Ashley McKenzie may also refer to:

- Ashley McKenzie (director) (born 1984), Canadian film director
- Ashley McKenzie (singer) (born 1986), English singer and contestant on The X Factor in 2006
