= Ashley Kelly =

Ashley Kelly may refer to:

- Ashley Kelly (footballer), English footballer
- Ashley Kelly (sprinter), British Virgin Islander sprinter
- Ashley Callie, South African actress
