= Ashley Morgan =

Ashley Morgan may refer to:

- Ashley Morgan (Hustle), character from the television series Hustle
- Ash Morgan, contestant in The Voice UK series 2
