= Ashley Lane =

Ashley Lane may refer to:

- Ashley Lane (boxer) (born 1990), British boxer
- Ashley Lane (Hendon), nature reserve in London
- Madison Rayne, American professional wrestler formerly known as Ashley Lane
