= Ashley Hunter (cartoonist) =

New Zealand engineer, artist, photographer and cartoonist

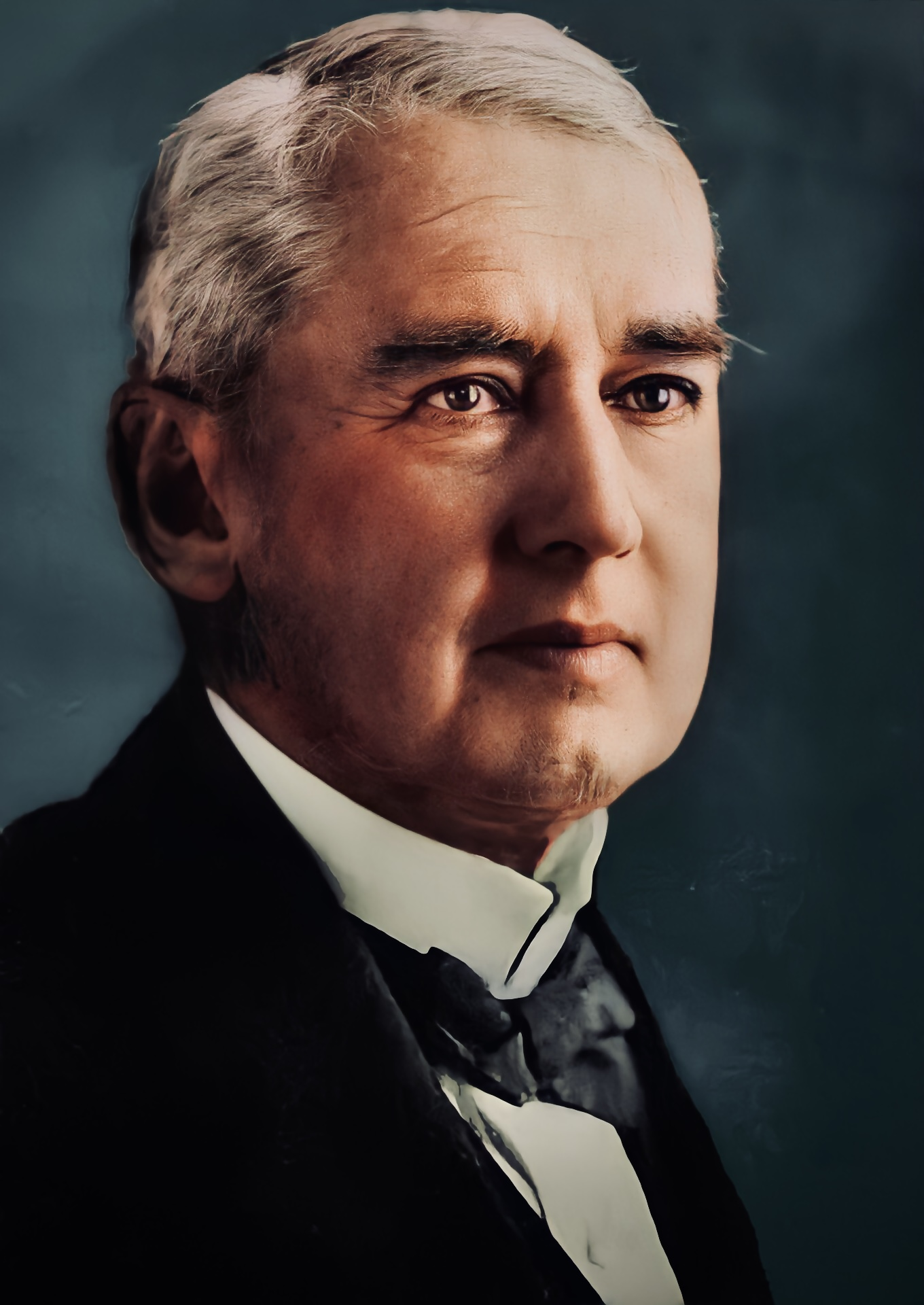
Taken circa 1923 from the Past Presidents Album of the Institution of Professional Engineers New Zealand (IPENZ). Colourised by his great great grandson, Ashley Catton

Ashley John Barsley Hunter (1854–1932) was a New Zealand engineer, artist, photographer and cartoonist. Although principally employed as an engineer, his cartoons appeared in the New Zealand Graphic, Ladies Journal and Youth Companion (1890–1913) in the 1890s and 1900s.

== Biography ==
Hunter was born in England and moved to New Zealand in 1871 with his family. He married Eliza Jane Halyday in 1878; he died in Auckland in 1932.

After working as a photographer upon arrival in New Zealand, Hunter was appointed as an engineering cadet in the Public Works Department in Wellington (1872.) He continued to work for the Public Works Department until 1882, when he went into private practice in partnership with James Stewart. Hunter then went on to become an engineer for the Westport Coal Company (1894–1897), the Paparoa Coal Company (1906–1910), the Waipa Coal Company and the Westport Stockton Coal Company (1910–1913). In 1918, he was responsible for laying out the Glen Afton coal mine and the Huntly branch railway.

He was a member of the UK Institution of Civil Engineers and president of the New Zealand Society of Civil Engineers from 1922 to 1923.
