= Ashley Wright =

Ashley Wright may refer to:

- Ashley Wright (cricketer) (born 1980), English cricketer
- Ashley B. Wright (1841–1897), American politician
