= Ashly Rae =

- Born: Aberdeenshire, Scotland
- Occupations: businesswoman and entrepreneur

Ashly Rae is a Scottish former model and actress. She is a businesswoman and entrepreneur who launched positive fashion brand elswear in April 2022.

== Biography ==
Ashly was born and brought up in Aberdeenshire, Scotland. After landing her first commercial at the age of 8, she went on to study drama and dance throughout her teenage years, and then worked professionally as a model. She won a coveted slot as one of the models for the annual Rock and Republic show in LA, working alongside many well known models including Victoria's Secret Miranda Kerr.

She is known for insuring her 44-inch legs for £1,000,000 with Lloyd's of London.

She was named as the face of top global fashion label, Flora Kung. She has appeared in ads worldwide and on point of sale collateral in department stores such as Harrods, London.

Ashly has played in Hollywood films, including the teen comedy National Lampoon's Van Wilder: The Rise of Taj in 2006 and the horror flick Goldfield Murders in 2007. In 2013, she appeared as Kelly in the Hollywood movie The Portal, starring Michael Madsen and Stacy Keach.

== Filmography ==
=== Actress ===
- National Lampoon's Van Wilder: The Rise of Taj (2006) (as Irish Girl)
- Ghosts of Goldfield / "Accursed Blood" (2007) (as Elizabeth)
- The Portal (2013), completed (as Nurse Kelly)

=== Writer, Producer, Director, Cinematographer, Editor, Sound Department ===
- Never Forgot (2010)
- Empty Pages (2011)

=== Visual Effects ===
- Never Forgot (2010)

=== Writer, Producer ===
- From Prey to Hunter (2010)
