= Ashleigh Shelby Rosette =

American management scholar

- Born: Jasper, Texas
- Spouse: Christopher Rosette

Academic background
- Education: BBA, 1994, MA, accounting, 1995, University of Texas at Austin; PhD, 2003, Kellogg School of Management
- Thesis: Unacknowledged privilege: setting the stage for discrimination in organizational settings. (2003)

Ashleigh Shelby Rosette is an American management and organizations scholar. She is the Senior Associate Dean of Executive MBA and Non-Degree Programs at Duke University's Fuqua School of Business.

== Early life and education ==
Ashleigh Rosette was born and raised in Jasper, Texas to parents Cleveland Shelby and Lillie Faith Shelby. She earned her Bachelor in Business Administration degree and Master in Professional Accounting degree from the University of Texas at Austin before receiving her PhD in Management and Organizations from the Kellogg School of Management at Northwestern University. As a doctoral student, Shelby Rosette had the opportunity to work as a teaching assistant to Oprah Winfrey and Stedman Graham.

== Career ==
Ashleigh Rosette began her career in academic after working as a Certified Public Accountant for Arthur Andersen. She accepted an assistant professor position at University of Houston following her Ph.D., where she stayed until 2005 before joining the faculty at Duke University's Fuqua School of Business. Prior to joining their faculty, Shelby Rosette consulted various current and former Duke faculty and administrators regarding concerns about the institutions "commitment to attracting underrepresented minority and women." She is currently the James L. Vincent Distinguished Professor of Leadership.

Upon accepting her placement, Rosette began examining the differences in leadership expectations in regards to race and gender in corporate position. One of her first research papers at Duke was on the topic of diversity in leadership, which found that the majority of Americans expected business leaders to be white and thought more highly of them. She said that due to the appointment of Barack Obama, "much of the feedback was not critical of the theory or of the analysis, but people doubted that the phenomenon mattered, that it was even relevant for organizational studies. A few years later, Rosette published a study which concluded that the negative stereotype surrounding women as "sensitive" often benefited those at the most senior levels of organizations. She came to this finding by having 323 graduate and undergraduate students review fictitious newspaper clippings and evaluate the male or female CEOs mentioned. Along with a graduate student, they found that students evaluated women CEOS more favorably than comparable male CEOs.

As a result of her research, Shelby Rosette was ranked as one of the Forty Best Business School Professors under Forty by Poets & Quants and also received the Triangle Business Journal's 40 Under 40 Leadership Award. In January 2012, Shelby Rosette and Andrew Carton from Pennsylvania State University began examining the differences in media representations of leadership between black and white college football quarterbacks. They found that oftentimes black college football quarterbacks were judged as less effective leaders than their white counterparts and when they won games, the media praised them for being great athletes rather than great leaders. That same year, she also co-published Failure is not an option for Black women: Effects of organizational performance on leaders with single versus dual-subordinate identities and Can an agentic Black woman get ahead? The impact of race and interpersonal dominance on perceptions of female leaders.

In August 2020, Shelby Rosette was the lead author of a study that reaffirmed that Black women with natural hairstyles were less likely to get job interviews.
