= Ashley Miller =

Ashley Miller may refer to:

- Ashley Miller (director) (1867–1949), American director and writer
- Ashley Miller (screenwriter) (born 1971), American screenwriter and producer
- Ashley Miller (footballer) (born 1994), English footballer
- Ashley Miller (hurdler) (born 1999), Zimbabwean athlete
- Ashley Miller (wrestler) (born 1988), American professional wrestler known as Audrey Marie
