= Ashley Robertson (singer) =

Canadian country music singer

Ashley Robertson is a Canadian country music singer. She won the European Country Music Association Female Vocalist of the Year award two times.

== Discography ==
- Start Again
- "Woman in the White Dress" on 2012 Compliance (film) soundtrack
