= Ashley Smith =

Ashley Smith may refer to:

- Ashley Smith (author) (born 1978), American author, speaker, and hostage
- Ashley Smith (rugby union) (born 1987), Welsh rugby player
- Ashley Smith (Australian footballer) (born 1990), Australian rules football player
- Ashley Smith (died 2007), Canadian teenage prisoner, whose death while incarcerated led to the Ashley Smith inquest
- Grace McDougall (1887–1963), or Grace Ashley-Smith, officer of the British First Aid Nursing Yeomanry
- Ashley William Smith (born 1984), Australian musician
