= Ashley Grace =

Ashley Grace may refer to:

- Ashley Grace, a member of the music duo Ha*Ash
- Ashley Grace, also known as Ashley Hinshaw, an American actress and model
- Ashley Grace Twichell, American swimmer
