= Ashleigh Nelson =

Ashleigh Nelson is the name of:

- Ashleigh Nelson (field hockey) (born 1987), Australian hockey player
- Ashleigh Nelson (sprinter) (born 1991), English sprinter
