= Ashley Palmer =

Ashley Palmer may refer to:

- Ashley Palmer (footballer) (born 1992), English footballer
- Ashley Palmer (actress), American actress and singer
