= Ashleigh Vaughn =

South African water polo player

Personal information
- Nationality: South African
- Born: 17 May 1999 (age 27) Cape Town, South Africa
- Height: 174 cm (69 in)

Sport
- Sport: Water polo
- Position: Utility
- Current club: Nelson Mandela university
- Number: 6 and 11

Ashleigh Vaughn (born 17 May 1999) is a South African water polo player, and coach. She is a member of the South Africa women's national water polo team. She was part of the team in the women's water polo tournament at the 2020 Summer Olympics, held July–August 2021 in Tokyo.

She participated at the 2016 FINA World Women's Youth Water Polo Championships, and 2017 FINA World Women's Junior Waterpolo Championships.
