= Ashley Davies (disambiguation) =

Ashley Davies is a character in the TV series South of Nowhere.

Ashley Davies may also refer to:

- Ashley Davies, drummer of Wild Pumpkins at Midnight
- Ashley Davies, a character in the Inspector Morse episode "The Daughters of Cain"

== See also ==
- Ashley Davis (disambiguation)
- Ashley Slanina-Davies (born 1989), actress
