= Ashly Lorenzana =

Ashly Lorenzana (born 1987) is an American sex worker, freelance writer and writer of the autobiographical memoir titled Sex, Drugs & Being an Escort. Lorenzana currently resides in Portland, Oregon where she was born.

== Writing ==
Lorenzana's memoir, Sex, Drugs & Being an Escort, is a collection of journal entries written between the years 2006 and 2010. The frequency of journal entries is quite erratic; some months include several entries while others are spaced several weeks apart. Some months included in the journal pass in complete silence, featuring no entries at all.

Lorenzana is given credit for a number of quotations which circulate heavily on social sites such as Twitter and Tumblr, most of which relate to addiction, honesty and perception. Her work has also been quoted in a number of online articles and publications, sometimes using her analogies and satire on the topic of drug addiction to illustrate points made on unrelated subjects, including finance.

After publishing her memoir, Lorenzana was invited to be a guest at The Red Umbrella Diaries live reading event in New York City, hosted by sex worker advocate Audacia Ray.

== Sex work ==
Ashly began her work as an independent escort around 2005, at the age of seventeen. She primarily advertised her services on Craigslist in the now defunct "Erotic Services" sub-forum after learning that her mother was also using the site to find customers for her escort services. In various news stories, Lorenzana has voiced her support for online escort forums and communities, claiming that they provide a safer environment for sex workers and allow for easier screening of new clients.

== Substance abuse ==
Lorenzana is known for openly admitting to struggling with substance abuse problems, particularly a long lasting methamphetamine addiction that began in her late teens. In her writing and in several interviews, she has explained that her mother was also an addict and that the two of them often engaged in recreational drug use together as a shared hobby.

== Controversy ==
In an August 2012 column in The New York Times, Lorenzana is credited for writing a consumer review which led to the ultimate demise of paid review service GettingBookReviews.com. Lorenzana wrote the negative review and published it on a number of consumer complaint sites after initially hiring GettingBookReviews.com to review her memoir, and later declaring that the company was in fact scamming their customers and that she refused to use their reviews after learning that writers were only being paid to write five star reviews for books.
