= Ashley Campbell =

Ashley Campbell may refer to:

- Ashley Campbell (tennis) (1880–1943), Australian tennis player
- Ashley Campbell (actor) (born 1979), British stage and television actor
- Ashley Campbell (singer) (born 1986), singer-songwriter and daughter of Glen Campbell

== See also ==
- George Ashley Campbell (1870–1954), American electrical engineer
