= Ashley Westwood =

Ashley Westwood may refer to:

- Ashley Westwood (footballer, born 1976), English footballer and manager
- Ashley Westwood (footballer, born 1990), English footballer
