= Ashley E. Davis =

American government official and corporate executive

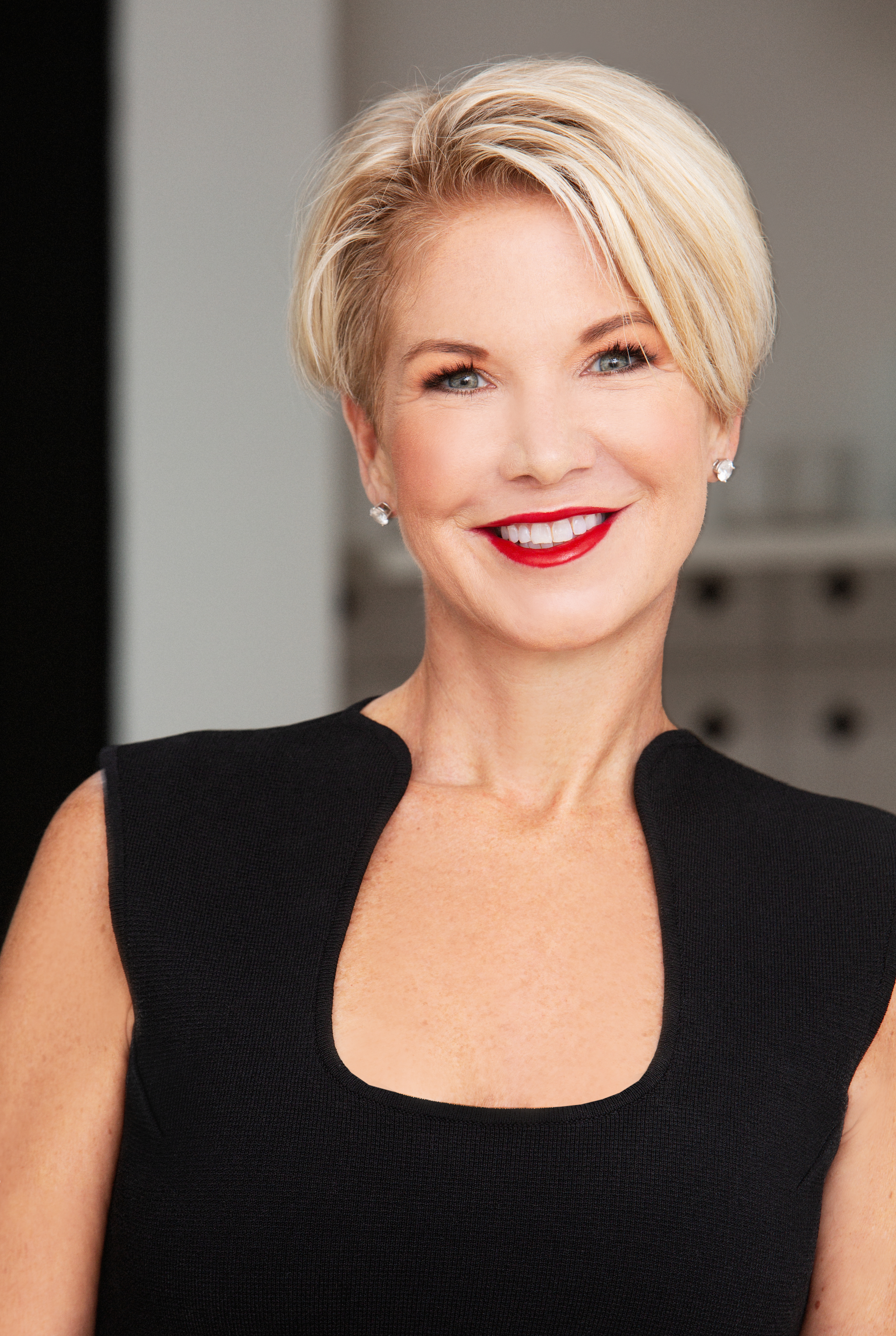

Former US government official

Personal details
- Education: MBA
- Alma mater: Westminster College (PA) & Georgetown University
- Occupation: Corporate executive
- Cabinet: George Bush White House official

Ashley E. Davis is an American corporate executive and former government official. She is a partner at S-3 Group, a public affairs consultancy.

== Education ==
Davis was educated at Westminster College, Pennsylvania and has a master's degree in business administration from Georgetown University.

== Career ==
Davis has experience in both public and private sector. She has worked in front of the Energy and Commerce, Health, Education Labor and Pensions, Ways and Means and Finance Committees in both United States House of Representatives and United States Senate. She was a special assistant to Secretary of Homeland Security Tom Ridge.

Davis is a partner at S-3 group, a public affairs consultancy. Previously, she was a lead principal at West Front Strategies, a lobbying firm she co-founded in 2015.

She served as a managing principal on the executive committee of Blank Rome.

On February 4, 2026, Davis appeared on NBC News' Meet the Press. She discussed President Trump's immigration policy and the predicted government shutdown of DHS in February 2026.
