= Ashley Jackson =

Ashley Jackson may refer to:

- Ashley Jackson (artist) (born 1940), English landscape watercolourist
- Ashley Jackson (historian) (born 1971), British historian and senior lecturer
- Ashley Jackson (field hockey) (born 1987), English field hockey player
