= Ashley Day (English cricketer) =

English cricketer

Personal information
- Full name: Ashley Christopher Day
- Born: 26 March 1969 (age 57); Hartlepool, County Durham, England
- Batting: Right-handed
- Bowling: Right-arm medium-fast

Domestic team information
- Years: Team
- 2001–2002: Durham Cricket Board
- 1988–1991: Durham

Career statistics
Competition	LA
Matches	2
Runs scored	1
Batting average	1.00
100s/50s	–/–
Top score	1
Balls bowled	114
Wickets	4
Bowling average	17.00
5 wickets in innings	–
10 wickets in match	–
Best bowling	2/32
Catches/stumpings	–/–
- Source: Cricinfo, 6 November 2010

Ashley Christopher Day (born 26 March 1969) is a former English cricketer. Day was a right-handed batsman who bowled right-arm medium-fast. He was born at Hartlepool, County Durham.

Day made his debut in County Cricket for Durham in 1988, making his debut in the Minor Counties Championship against Bedfordshire. From 1988 to 1991, he represented the county in seven Championship matches, the last of which came against Hertfordshire. Day also represented the county in MCCA Knockout Trophy. His debut Trophy match came against Northumberland in 1988. From 1988 to 1989, he represented the county in two further Trophy matches against Lincolnshire and Cumberland. Following Durham's elevation to first-class status at the end of the 1991 season, Day played no further matches for the county.

Day later represented the Durham Cricket Board in two List A matches against Hertfordshire in the 2001 Cheltenham & Gloucester Trophy and Herefordshire in 2nd round of the 2003 Cheltenham & Gloucester Trophy which was held in 2002. In his two List A matches, he took four wickets at a bowling average of 17.00, with best figures of 2/23.
