= Ashley James (curator) =

American curator

- Education: Columbia University (BA); Yale University (PhD)
- Occupation: Curator
- Organization: Guggenheim Museum

Ashley James is an American curator. She has worked at the Studio Museum in Harlem, the Museum of Modern Art and the Brooklyn Museum. In 2019, she became the first full-time black curator at the Guggenheim.

== Biography ==
James, who is of Jamaican parentage, earned her bachelor's degree at Columbia University in 2009. After Columbia, she worked as an intern at the Studio Museum in Harlem. James earned her master's degree at Yale University, where she studied English literature and African American studies. While at Yale, she was a co-curator in 2014 at the Yale University Art Gallery of the exhibition Odd Volumes: Book Art from the Allan Chasanoff Collection. James was a Mellon Curatorial Fellow at the Museum of Modern Art.

The Brooklyn Museum hired James as an assistant curator of contemporary art in 2017. While at the Brooklyn Museum, she was a "moving force behind the acclaimed exhibition Soul of a Nation: Art in the Age of Black Power.'" She was lead curator and it was the largest she had ever worked on before. James was also played a major role in making acquisitions and doing public programming for the museum.

James started as an associate curator of contemporary art at the Guggenheim in November 2019. She is the first black curator to work for the museum full-time. Her debut exhibition, Off the Record, in 2021, featured 13 artists with works "that challenge the presumption of objectivity in historical records, journalism and photography."
