= Ashleigh Buch =

US air force instructor

Ashleigh Buch (born October 19, 1984) is a United States Air Force instructor, and ultimate player. She was the first out transgender service member to work at Offutt Air Force Base in Omaha, Nebraska, and transitioned under the Obama administration's policy that enabled transgender service members to serve openly. She taught linguistics at Offutt, and has mentored several other transgender service members at the Air Force base. Buch has also played ultimate for Kansas City Wicked, which competes in the USA Ultimate Club Women's division, and was on the first roster of Washington DC Shadow of the Premier Ultimate League before the 2020 season was canceled due to COVID-19.

== Personal life ==
Buch was raised in Fairfield, Iowa, and attended Iowa State University where she studied Spanish and secondary education. She then joined the Air Force in 2009 and started transitioning in 2012 away from work. Once the Obama administration released its policy for transgender military personnel in 2016, though, Buch made the move to transition at work. Since transitioning, she helped lead the way for other transgender service members, receiving messages from people around the country saying "you gave me the courage to come out." In ultimate, Buch consulted with USA Ultimate on their transgender policy update in 2018. She was also recognized as one of the "Rad Women of Omaha" in 2018.
