= Ashley Spencer =

Ashley Spencer is the name of:

- Ashley Spencer (hurdler) (born 1993), American sprinter and hurdler
- Ashley Spencer (actress) (born 1985), American musical theatre actress
