= FasciaBlaster =

Self-massage device invented by Ashley Black

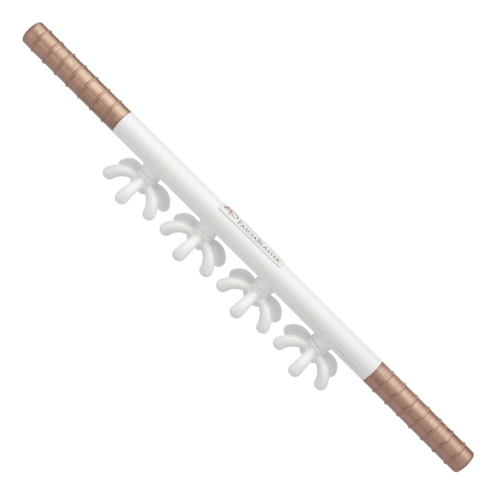
- Type: Self-massage device
- Inventor: Ashley Black
- Manufacturer: Ashley Black/ADB Interest, LLC
- Website: FasciaBlaster.com

The FasciaBlaster is a device invented by entrepreneur Ashley Black primarily as a self-massage method to help reduce cellulite. There is no evidence it is effective, and claims made by Black about fascia have been characterized as pseudoscience. The FasciaBlaster is marketed as expected to cause bruising, and some users have reported various injuries in addition to bruising following use.

== Overview ==
The FasciaBlaster is a hand-held bar with plastic claw-like parts intended to be applied to the skin and then used to massage the fascia underneath the skin, to reduce cellulite and stiffness.

The device was invented by entrepreneur Ashley Black. As of 2017, Black was not a licensed physical therapist. She initially marketed the tool as the Lumpbuster in 2012 for her work as a health and wellness trainer.

Black has marketed bruises caused by the FasciaBlaster as an indication of treatment effectiveness, and has described the bruising injuries from the device as similar to the pseudoscientific practice known as cupping. A physiotherapist speaking with the Evening Standard in 2018 about the FasciaBlaster stated "anything that causes pain should only be used under the guidance of a doctor, physiotherapist or other trained medical professional."

The FasciaBlaster was featured on Today in March 2017, where it was noted that Black advises bruising can be expected, and in 2018, the device was used on Kourtney Kardashian in an episode trailer for Keeping Up with the Kardashians. Model Toni Garrn described "lots of bruising" in 2017 while also praising "immediate results" after working with Black. A 2020 review in Essence magazine noted "immediate results" as well as "soreness and bruising" after Black used the tool on the reviewer. A 2017 review of three months of self-use by a reviewer for the Santa Monica Observer described "many many jaw dropping bruises" and warned "they also might last twice as long as a "normal" bruise."

Some users have reported various injuries after use of the FasciaBlaster, including severe bruising, and have submitted complaints to the Food and Drug Administration in the United States. FDA complaints reviewed by BuzzFeed News in 2017 also included reports of inflammation and changes in menstruation. On Facebook, user complaints in 2017 included "severe bruising, weight gain, sagging skin, increased cellulite, nausea, and menstruation changes."

On May 22, 2017, the Terms of Use Agreement was updated on the fasciablaster.com website to include warnings that the device can cause "vomiting, hormone changes, increased sensitivity, headaches, acute inflammation, changes in cycle, reoccurrence of pre-existing condition, weight gain and other toxicity-associated symptoms," in addition to prior warnings that included "rashes, bumps, redness, irritation, itching" and "bruising."

== Lack of evidence for "fascia blasting" ==
According to The New York Times in 2023, "If you choose to use a self-massaging device, don’t overdo it: No evidence supports the recent trend of "fascia blasting," or aggressively manipulating fascia through the skin, which can lead to bruising." In 2017, a chief of bariatric and minimally invasive surgery at Stanford Health Care told BuzzFeed News, "A bruise does not equal fascia being broken up," and an assistant professor of dermatology at Yale School of Medicine said "Bruises are pathologic, or an indication of tissue injury, and shouldn’t be the goal of a treatment."

Ashley Diana Black International Holdings, LLC contributed funding to a study published in Cogent Medicine in 2019 that was conducted by the Applied Science and Performance Institute (ASPI) of Tampa, Florida, which studied 33 women who used the FasciaBlaster five days a week over 12 weeks, and concluded the tool "may be a viable method in treating cellulite" while also noting some subjects reported "mild symptoms of irritability, nausea, headaches, and bruising."

Before the ASPI study appeared in Cogent Medicine, it was posted on the Ashley Black Guru website, with pictures of subjects and claims of FasciaBlaster effectiveness. Doctors who spoke with HuffPost after the study was published by Cogent Medicine in 2019 agreed the FasciaBlaster is not an effective cure for cellulite, and a plastic surgeon said, "It is clear that more research needs to be done in developing better treatments for cellulite."

In 2017, a sports medicine doctor said "the research is still in its infancy" when speaking with Harper's BAZAAR about the FasciaBlaster and the relationship between cellulite and fascia. According to medical experts who spoke with Buzzfeed News in 2017, various claims made by Black about bruises, fascia, and cellulite are lacking in scientific basis and evidence. A doctor from the Massachusetts General Hospital Dermatology Laser and Cosmetic Center said temporary swelling after use of the device may cause the perception of a cellulite reduction.

According to Buzzfeed News in 2017, "Black has developed an entire pseudoscience around a real type of tissue, fascia, which connects muscle to skin and contributes to the appearance of cellulite." A 2018 consensus statement on fascial tissue research in sports medicine published by the British Journal of Sports Medicine noted a lack of validation for the efficacy of "manual therapies, such as massage" and stated, "While commercial and other interests often favour the promotion of premature positive conclusions about specific fascia-related treatments, strict application of scientific rigour is essential for the development of this promising field."

== Litigation ==
In 2017, two proposed class action lawsuits began against Ashley Black, Ashley Diana Black International Holdings, L.L.C., ADB Interests, L.L.C., Ashley Black Company, ADB Innovations, L.L.C., Ashley Black Guru, and Ashley Black Fasciology, L.L.C., for various torts. The cases were consolidated into one case, Elson v. Black, in 2018. In Elson v. Black, the United States Court of Appeals for the Fifth Circuit on January 5, 2023, reversed the dismissal of two claims in the class action lawsuit and returned the case to the trial court.

A lawsuit alleging defamation and other torts brought by ADB Interest, LLC and Ashley Black on May 25, 2017, against a FasciaBlaster user who complained of injury from the device on Facebook was dismissed, and damages and costs amounting to over $250,000 were awarded against ADB and Black in an anti-SLAPP repudiation under the Texas Citizens Participation Act. The 2018 decision was upheld by the Texas Courts of Appeals in 2020.

In July 2017, ADB began lawsuits alleging business disparagement by two individuals who had participated in studies sponsored by ADB and then posted negative comments on Facebook about the FasciaBlaster after signing non-disclosure agreements, but ADB later dismissed the lawsuits.
