= Ashley Bell =

Ashley Bell may refer to:

== People ==
- Ashley Bell (actress) (born 1986), American actress
- Ashley Bell (Georgia politician), politician based in Georgia
- Ashley Bell, politician who ran in the 2026 United States House of Representatives elections in North Carolina

== Other ==
- Ashley Bell, a 2015 novel by Dean Koontz

== See also ==
- Ashleigh Ball, Canadian voice actress and musician
