= Storm Ashley =

2024 windstorm over northwestern Europe

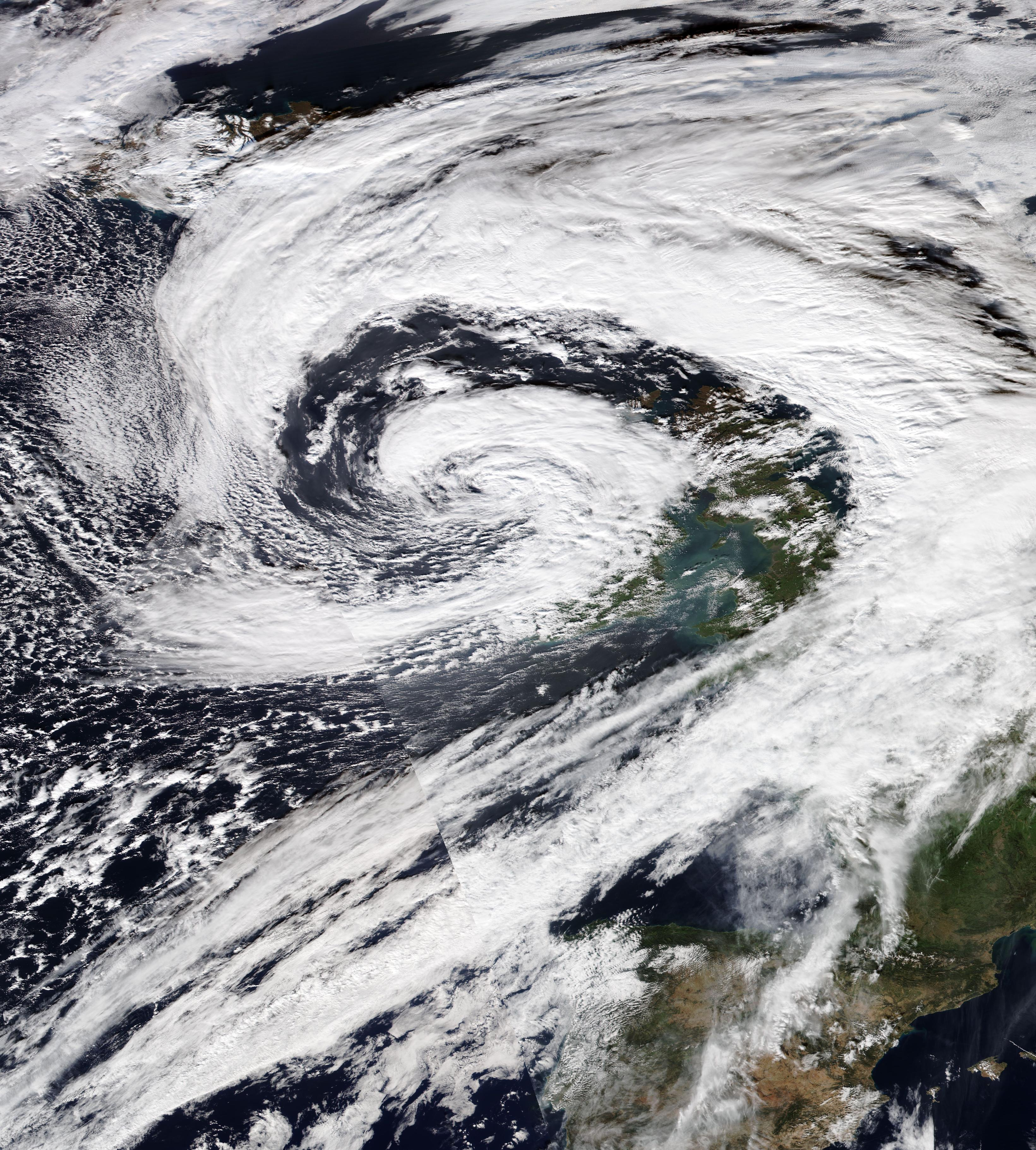
- Storm Ashley on 20 October 2024

Meteorological history
- Formed: 18 October 2024
- Dissipated: 21 October 2024

Extratropical cyclone
- Highest gusts: 195 km/h (121 mph; 105 kn) at Cairn Gorm, Scotland
- Lowest pressure: 959 hPa (mbar); 28.32 inHg

Overall effects
- Fatalities: 0
- Areas affected: United Kingdom, Ireland, Norway
- Part of the 2024–25 European windstorm season

Storm Ashley was the first named storm of the 2024–25 European windstorm season from the 'western group' list of names, being named by Ireland. It was also known in Germany as Josefine, being named by Free University of Berlin.

== Weather warnings ==
Map plotting the storm's track and intensity, according to the Saffir–Simpson scale Map key Saffir–Simpson scale Tropical depression (≤38 mph, ≤62 km/h) Tropical storm (39–73 mph, 63–118 km/h) Category 1 (74–95 mph, 119–153 km/h) Category 2 (96–110 mph, 154–177 km/h) Category 3 (111–129 mph, 178–208 km/h) Category 4 (130–156 mph, 209–251 km/h) Category 5 (≥157 mph, ≥252 km/h) Unknown Storm type Tropical cyclone Subtropical cyclone Extratropical cyclone, remnant low, tropical disturbance, or monsoon depression

Storm Ashley was forecast to first impact Ireland, thus being named by Met Éireann. The Met Office issued an amber warning in western Scotland due to the threat of strong winds on Sunday afternoon and evening.

In Ireland, Storm Ashley is expected to bring strong and gusty southerly winds western Ireland, combined with high spring tides where an orange wind warning was issued place. This hazardous weather event could lead to several impacts including, coastal flooding, large coastal waves, and displaced objects are possible due to the powerful winds and rising sea levels. Fallen trees could block roads and damage property. The severe weather could make driving hazardous and conditions at sea will be extremely dangerous. Widespread power outages may occur due to damage to power lines. Additionally, buildings that have already been weakened may be further damaged by the strong winds. A wider yellow wind warning was issued for the rest of Ireland for the impacts.

After impacting the British Isles a day previously, Ashley impacted western Norway where an orange wind warning was in force for parts of the Sognefjorden to Sunnmøre regions on the west coast, with a broad yellow warning encompassing it.

== Impacts ==
As the storm passed over the Scottish Highlands on Sunday night, average wind speeds hit 137 kilometres per hour (85 mph) with gusts of at least 179 kilometres per hour (111 mph) provisionally recorded at the summit of Cairn Gorm. Speed restrictions are in place on rail lines across Scotland due to the high winds, while flights continued to be impacted at Aberdeen Airport this morning. At least four have been cancelled, including one bound for London Heathrow Airport. In England, National Rail said Northern services between Bolton and Blackburn were being blocked by a tree on the line this morning. The Environment Agency had 45 flood warnings, where flooding is expected, in place across England on Monday, including along the south Cornwall coast and large parts of the River Severn, after the river burst its banks, submerging the town of Worcester, the previous day. An injured passenger was airlifted from a ferry between Aberdeen and Orkney on Sunday evening after falling on board in rough conditions. Earlier, police said a man, woman and young boy were taken to hospital after experiencing difficulty in the sea at Aberdeen Beach.

== Top wind gust ==
A top windspeed of 121 mph (195 km/h) was recorded at the Cairngorm Summit, Inverness-shire, Scotland, United Kingdom.
