= Ashley Treatment =

Controversial 1997 set of child medical procedures

Ashley X
- Born: 1997 (age 28–29); Seattle, Washington
- Website: http://www.pillowangel.org/

The 'Ashley Treatment' refers to a set of controversial medical procedures performed on a young American girl commonly referred to as 'Ashley X'. Ashley, a child diagnosed with severe intellectual and developmental disabilities, underwent growth attenuation via high-dose estrogen therapy, as well as hysterectomy and breast bud removal surgeries. These interventions were performed with the stated goal of improving quality of life and facilitating long-term care.

The case outcome prompted international controversy. It also received notable critiques from disability rights groups and activists. Supporters argue that these procedures were performed in Ashley's best interests and cite various ethical frameworks in favor of the treatment.

Opponents raised concerns that Ashley's rights to individual autonomy and dignity were violated. The medical establishment faced significant criticism from disability rights bodies for pursuing permanent medical procedures rather than advocating for expanded social supports for disabled people.

The Ashley Treatment has been widely discussed in disability rights and bioethics circles.

== Background ==
In 1997, Ashley X was born with static encephalopathy, a brain disorder that resulted in severe intellectual and developmental disabilities. Though her birth was unremarkable, her cognitive abilities and motor skills did not develop. Tests and examinations were performed, revealing that her impairments were permanent. This meant that, while Ashley's physical growth would continue, she would remain cognitively the equivalent of a 3 month old.

Ashley is non-ambulatory and non-verbal. She is tube fed and requires full-time care from her caregivers. Her parents refer to her as their "Pillow Angel," a nickname referencing her tendency to remain in the same position on a pillow.

In 2004, the parents observed signs of early puberty in their daughter. Fearing that further physical development would impact Ashley's quality of life and of the care that they would be able to provide her in the future, they sought medical consultation as to the possibility of growth attenuation.

The specific etiology of the disorder remained unknown for 18 years, but was finally revealed in June 2016. It was discovered that the static encephalopathy was due to a SNP mutation in the GRIN1 gene.

== Treatment description ==
At 6 years, 7 months of age, Ashley's parents became concerned about when she began showing signs of early puberty. She was then referred to a pediatric endocrine service for further evaluation. In her first month of life, the child began exhibiting signs of abnormal development, including muscle weakness, irregular movements, difficulties with feeding, and significant developmental delay. It was concluded that she would never mentally progress from the infant developmental stage.

In 2008, Ashley's parents stated that she was currently and would always remain to be profoundly dependent on them for satisfaction of her needs. Her parents deem her to be a 'permanently unabled' child, which they describe as a category of children with severe disabilities (about 1%) whose survival is primarily made possible by modern medical advancements. They, like many other caregivers of these children, assert that the quality of the lives that these children are able to lead are best facilitated by their families that can provide home health care, as an alternative to institutionalization.

The interventions proposed were growth attenuation through high-dose estrogen therapy, hysterectomy, and breast bud removal. The hysterectomy and breast bud removal were surgeries, whereas the growth attenuation involved hormone therapy. The stated goal was to improve her quality of life and ease continuing long-term care responsibilities.

=== Reasoning ===
The following summarizes the given reasoning for each of the three aspects of the Ashley Treatment that were provided by Ashley's parents. All operations and interventions took place at Seattle Children's Hospital.

==== For growth attenuation therapy via high-dose estrogen ====
Ashley's parents argued for attenuating her growth primarily because it would limit both her height and weight. The treatment was projected to reduce height by 20% and weight by 40%.

At the age of 6 years, 6 months, she was 48 inches tall, and was in the 75th percentile for height. Healthy development was likely to result in a 5' 6" height and a weight of around 125 pounds, according to the parents. Both of these outcomes could complicate matters for caregivers and limit the care that could be provided in the home. Other potential benefits were proposed, such as reducing her risk of skin sores, pneumonia, bladder infections, and complications related to her scoliosis and bone density.

Ultimately, the claim made by Ashley's parents and shared by her medical team was that growth attenuation would improve Ashley's quality of life by increasing the ease of transporting her for caregivers. This could increase her participation in activities of daily living.

==== For hysterectomy ====
Ashley's parents stated that a hysterectomy would eliminate menstruation and associated discomforts, such as menstrual cramps. They also cited concerns regarding her risk of pregnancy in the event of sexual abuse.

Studies have found that people with disabilities are at higher risk of sexual violence and abuse.

During the procedure, Ashley's uterus was removed, but her ovaries were left intact to allowed continued natural hormone production. The parents and medical team noted that this would also eliminate the risk of uterine cancer.

==== For breast bud removal ====
Ashley's parents and medical team decided to remove her breast buds because they claimed that developed breasts would not be functional to her; they would serve neither reproductive nor sexual purposes. According to her parents, breast development would likely only be a discomfort to her, as her principal challenges are comfort and boredom.

Her parents anticipated that Ashley may have large breasts due to family history and therefore argued that they could cause significant discomfort for her in her predominantly supine position. An additional concern was how having large breasts could also cause practical difficulties for her being strapped into her wheelchair, shower chair, and other necessary equipment.

Ashley's medical team described the procedure as involving minimal risk involved and that it was a fairly simple surgery. The developing breast tissue, including ductal structures and bilateral breast buds, were removed during the procedure. Her parents noted that there were three other potential benefits: avoiding breast cancer and fibrocystic breast changes, which were significant in her family history, and reducing the potential of being sexualized through handling by her caregivers, which they associated with an increased risk for potential sexual abuse.

These changes were later challenged by disability rights activists and bioethicists, who raised concerns about autonomy and medical necessity.

==== Additional surgical interventions ====
Ashley's appendix was surgically removed by doctors as prompted by parental concerns. As appendicitis occurs in 5% of children and Ashley may have been susceptible to it, they expressed concerns that she would be unable to vocalize her symptoms and pain if it should occur. Because an appendectomy is a common feature of abdominal surgery, there was little difficulty in deciding in favor of the surgery.

== Public disclosure and media response ==
Initial public awareness of the Ashley Treatment can be traced to a 2006 medical case report by physicians Daniel F. Gunther and Douglas S. Diekema. According to Ashley’s father, the publication contributed to increased media attention and emerging public controversy. In January 2007, Ashley’s family published an online account describing their decision-making process.

The blog attracted significant attention and the case was subsequently covered widely in national and international media, with hundreds of articles published on the topic. Media coverage reflected a range of responses. Some reports described expressions of sympathy for the family’s caregiving challenges, while others highlighted criticism of the medical interventions, with commentators questioning the necessity and proportionality of the procedures.

The case also generated substantial online discussion. Commentary included both support for the family’s decision and criticism regarding the motivations and implications of the treatment.

=== Ethical analyses ===
Ashley's case generated extensive ethical debates following its approval by the Seattle Children’s Hospital ethics board. The board consisted of 40 members and was chaired by Douglas Diekema. Scholars and commentators have identified several ethical tensions in the case, including autonomy and proxy decision-making, caregiver burden and patient rights, medical and social solutions, and protection and control.

- autonomy and proxy decision-making: The ethical principle of “Respect for Persons” in biomedical ethics emphasizes autonomy and self-determination. Because Ashley lacked decision-making capacity, commentators have noted that decisions were necessarily made by surrogate decision-makers, such as her parents and clinicians.
- caregiver burden and patient rights: Gunther and Diekema noted that growth attenuation could reduce the physical demands of long-term care giving, describing it as a potential benefit of the intervention, stating that "the primary benefit offered by growth attenuation is the potential to make caring for the child less burdensome and therefore more accessible". Critics argued that the case raised concerns regarding Ashley’s bodily integrity and whether caregiver needs were being prioritized over her interests.
- medical and social solutions: Some critics argued that the Ashley Treatment relied on permanent medical interventions rather than expanding social supports and accommodations for families of severely disabled children. Ethicist Chris Futner expressed feeling concerned by her case and the potential future increase in parents tasked with these decisions for their severely disabled children. He argued that the case reflected a broader tendency to address social problems through technological solutions, stating that “Our society has a tendency to want to solve big social problems with easy, relatively speaking, technological fixes.”

Bioethicist Arthur Caplan also criticized the treatment as a medical response to broader social shortcomings. While acknowledging the reasoning of Ashley’s parents and physicians, Caplan argued that growth attenuation represented “a pharmacological solution for a social failure”. He further stated that American society had failed to provide adequate support systems for families of children with severe disabilities, arguing that “a decent society should be able to provide appropriately sized wheelchairs and bathtubs and home-health assistance to families like this one."

- protection and control: Commentators identified a tension between protection and control, as supporters described the interventions as intended to reduce Ashley’s discomfort and future medical complications, while critics argued that the procedures involved extensive control over the body and development of a person unable to consent. As a severely disabled child incapable of expressing her autonomy, whether these procedures were done to protect her rights to quality of life or whether these were used in efforts to exact control over Ashley were debated.

Other areas of ethical discussion included the application of utilitarian ethics and the best interests standard. Questions regarding the appropriate scope and limits of medical intervention became a central feature of the debate.

=== Disability rights perspectives ===
The Ashley Treatment also prompted criticism from disability rights advocates, scholars, and parents of children with severe disabilities. Eva Feder Kittay, a mother of a severely disabled adult daughter, criticized the terminology used by Ashley's parents; she refrains from using angelic language to refer to her daughter because this "has the unfortunate side effect of edging her out of the human community".

Kittay compared the interventions to unintentionally watering a plant with vinegar, arguing that harmful actions may arise from good intentions. Kittay argued that the Treatment conceptualized Ashley’s body primarily as an instrument for performing tasks. Similarly, Epstein and Rosenbaum argued that the Treatment reflected assumptions that individuals with severe cognitive impairments could be denied bodily autonomy and sexual agency through substituted decision-making.

Tom Shakespeare argued that the Treatment risked establishing a precedent for surgically altering disabled bodies for caregiver convenience. The Ashley Treatment was also strongly opposed by the national grassroots disability rights organization Not Dead Yet, which argued that the procedures violated disability rights and constituted a non-therapeutic response to a non-lethal condition. The organization called for a total ban on the procedures regardless of ethics committee approval.

MindFreedom International also criticized the Ashley Treatment and expressed support for statements issued by disability-rights organizations including the DREDF, ADAPT, and FRIDA. MindFreedom International also expressed support of the DREDF statement that "Ashley has been denied her basic human rights through draconian interventions to her person" under Article 17 of the Convention on the Rights of Persons with Disabilities. DREDF argued that inadequate social supports, rather than disabled bodies, were the underlying problem.

=== Medical context ===
The Ashley Treatment emerged within broader medical discussions regarding the long-term management of profound disabilities in pediatric medicine. The case became associated with debates surrounding growth attenuation therapy, medical ethics, institutionalization, home versus institutional care, reproductive management, disability rights, bodily autonomy, and informed consent. It also spurred broader discussions concerning ableism, autonomy, dignity, family versus social responsibility, the limits of medicine, and societal perceptions of disabled lives.

Growth attenuation was originally proposed as a method of pediatric management of children with severe disabilities, particularly those that are non-ambulatory. Authors Gunther and Diekema acknowledged the difficulties of providing total care for aging disabled children to which they suggested growth attenuation as one possible response. This is done through treating the subject with high doses of estrogen therapy, which limits growth while simultaneously accelerating rapid growth of the epiphyseal plates, thereby significantly altering growth trajectories and enabling the continuation of comprehensive home care.

Debates involved whether the treatment was genuinely in the best interests of the patient according to the best interests standard. The best interests standard, a central principle in pediatric ethics and in the United Nations Convention on the Rights of the Child, emphasizes that decisions involving children should prioritize the child’s welfare and future well-being. Supporters of the treatment argued that it could improve Ashley’s quality of life by reducing discomfort and simplifying hygiene, positioning, and long-term care. Ashley’s parents also argued that the interventions preserved her dignity and could reduce risks associated with menstruation, certain cancers, and sexual abuse. The adherence to the principal of non-maleficence was also a topic of debate.

Disability rights activists and scholars reminded the public to locate the Ashley Treatment in the context of disability, specifically as it relates to parental decision-making, institutionalization, eugenics, forced sterilization, sexual vulnerability, and reproductive autonomy.

The Ashley Treatment was a case example of where the realities of caregiving and the control over disabled bodies collided with evolving medical capabilities and competing theories of bioethics. It is frequently examined within human rights discourse, disability studies, legal scholarship, feminist theory, sociology, and medical literature.

== Legal and regulatory matters ==
In a legal analysis, Jillian Kornblatt argued that the legal framework surrounding the Ashley Treatment did not adequately protect either the best interests or the constitutional rights of child patients and their parents. Kornblatt's analysis relied heavily on findings from the Washington Protection and Advocacy System (WPAS) investigation. This report also concluded that patient rights had been violated under constitutional and common law, as well as under Washington state law.

According to the WPAS report and the subsequent legal analysis by Kornblatt, Ashley's sterilization did not comply with Washington's legal requirements for non-therapeutic sterilization of minors. Kornblatt cited objections, invoking the previous court cases Buck v. Bell and Skinner v. Oklahoma. The right to procreate had been previously established as a fundamental right protected by the Fourteenth Amendment and considered part of the "zone of privacy" under the Bill of Rights. Significant court cases in Washington were In re Guardianship of Hayes and In re Guardianship of K.M. These stipulated requirements for sterilization approval that were not met in the case of Ashley X, because a court order for parents seeking sterilization of their child was not obtained and there was never an impartial third party figure designated to represent Ashley. The growth attenuation was sought and obtained without judicial oversight as well.

The Seattle Children's hospital's ethics committee approved the proposed treatment but recommended obtaining a court order before the sterilization procedure was performed. Ashley's parents instead followed the advice of their attorney, who argued that judicial approval was unnecessary because the hysterectomy was performed as part of a broader treatment plan rather than solely for sterilization purposes.

== Other cases ==
Following publicity surrounding Ashley's case, additional families sought similar interventions for children with profound disabilities. Reports in the years after the Ashley Treatment documented several subsequent recipients, including Erica, one of the first publicly identified children to undergo the full combination of growth attenuation therapy and surgical procedures, and Tom, the first publicly reported boy to receive growth attenuation therapy.

Although relatively few families publicly disclosed pursuing such interventions, reports and medical literature suggested that growth attenuation therapy continued to be used after Ashley's case. By 2016, at least 65 children were reported to have undergone growth attenuation therapy, though the number of children receiving the full Ashley Treatment remained unclear.

Additional families later publicly described pursuing growth attenuation therapy for their children, including in first-person accounts published in medical and popular media.

== See also ==
- Informed consent
- Bodily autonomy
- Bioethics
- Ableism
