= Steve Starks =

American businessman

- Born: c. 1979 (age 46–47); Northern Utah, United States
- Education: Weber State University
- Occupation: Businessman
- Known for: CEO of the Larry H. Miller Company
- Movement: The Church of Jesus Christ of Latter-day Saints
- Spouse: Camilla Starks
- Children: 3

Steve Starks is an American businessman from Utah. He is the chief executive officer (CEO) of the Larry H. Miller Company, a firm with interests in real estate, sports, entertainment, and senior healthcare. He previously served as president of the Utah Jazz and Miller Sports + Entertainment.

== Career ==
Starks' early career focused on politics and public policy. In 2003, he completed a congressional internship in the office of U.S. Senator Orrin Hatch. In 2004, he managed Nolan Karras's gubernatorial campaign and Rob Bishop's congressional campaign. He then joined incoming Governor Jon Huntsman Jr.'s transition team. In 2006, he became managing director of the Utah Policy Partnership, a public–private initiative focused on administrative efficiency across state agencies.

Starks joined the Larry H. Miller Group of Companies in 2007 after meeting Larry H. Miller in an elevator. Miller hired Starks as an assistant and executive shadow. In his early years with the company, Starks organized the Teach the Teacher initiative, supervised publication of Miller's biography, Driven, and worked on dealership showroom floors.

Starks was later promoted to executive vice president of Landcar Insurance Companies, rebranding it as Total Care Auto and expanding into new business lines. He also led corporate acquisitions, Saxton Horne Communications, Megaplex Theatres, and Fanzz Sports retail stores. In February 2018, he oversaw the sale of Fanzz, including Just Sports, to Ames Watson Capital.

In 2015, Starks became president of Larry H. Miller Sports & Entertainment. In this role, he managed operations for the Utah Jazz, Salt Lake City Stars (NBA G League), Salt Lake Bees (Triple-A Baseball), Vivint Smart Home Arena (now Delta Center), Megaplex Theatres, KJZZ-TV, and The Zone sports radio network. He led a $125 million renovation of the Delta Center in 2017 and secured the 2023 NBA All-Star Game for Salt Lake City.

On August 7, 2019, Starks was named CEO of the Larry H. Miller Group and appointed to its board. Starks succeeded Clark Whitworth. As CEO, he oversaw the sale of a majority stake in the Utah Jazz to Ryan Smith in 2020, alongside expansions into real estate, senior healthcare, and financial services. Starks has served as an alternate governor for the Utah Jazz in the NBA and currently serves as an alternate governor for the Utah Royals FC in the National Women's Soccer League.

In June 2021, Governor Spencer Cox appointed Starks as Utah's Olympic and Paralympic advisor. Starks serves as vice chair of the Salt Lake City–Utah 2034 Olympic and Paralympic Winter Games Organizing Committee and chair of Big League Utah, a group seeking a Major League Baseball expansion team.

Starks is a past chair of both the Salt Lake Chamber and the Economic Development Corporation of Utah. He served on the Utah Board of Higher Education and served on the Weber State University board of trustees from 2010 to 2017. He also serves on the Zions Bank advisory board.

== Early life, education, and family ==
Steve Starks was born in northern Utah to Steve Starks Sr., a former Los Angeles police officer and truck driver, and Debbie Starks. One of seven children, he grew up in Huntsville, Utah. He graduated from Weber High School at the age of 17.

To pay for college, Starks drove bread delivery trucks, maintained golf courses, and hung siding. He enrolled at Weber State University, paused his studies for a two-year mission for The Church of Jesus Christ of Latter-day Saints in Mississippi, serving as assistant to the mission president. He also completed a study abroad program at the University of Cambridge.

During his time at Weber State, Starks served in student government. He was student body president from 2001 to 2002, where he represented student interests and collaborated with university administrators on policy initiatives. He also served as a member of the university's board of trustees during the same period. Starks graduated in 2003. Starks is married to Camilla Starks. They have three daughters. They reside in South Jordan, Utah, a suburb of Salt Lake City.

Starks has served as a bishop and stake president in The Church of Jesus Christ of Latter-day Saints.
