= Swig (restaurant) =

American drink shop selling soft drinks and cookies

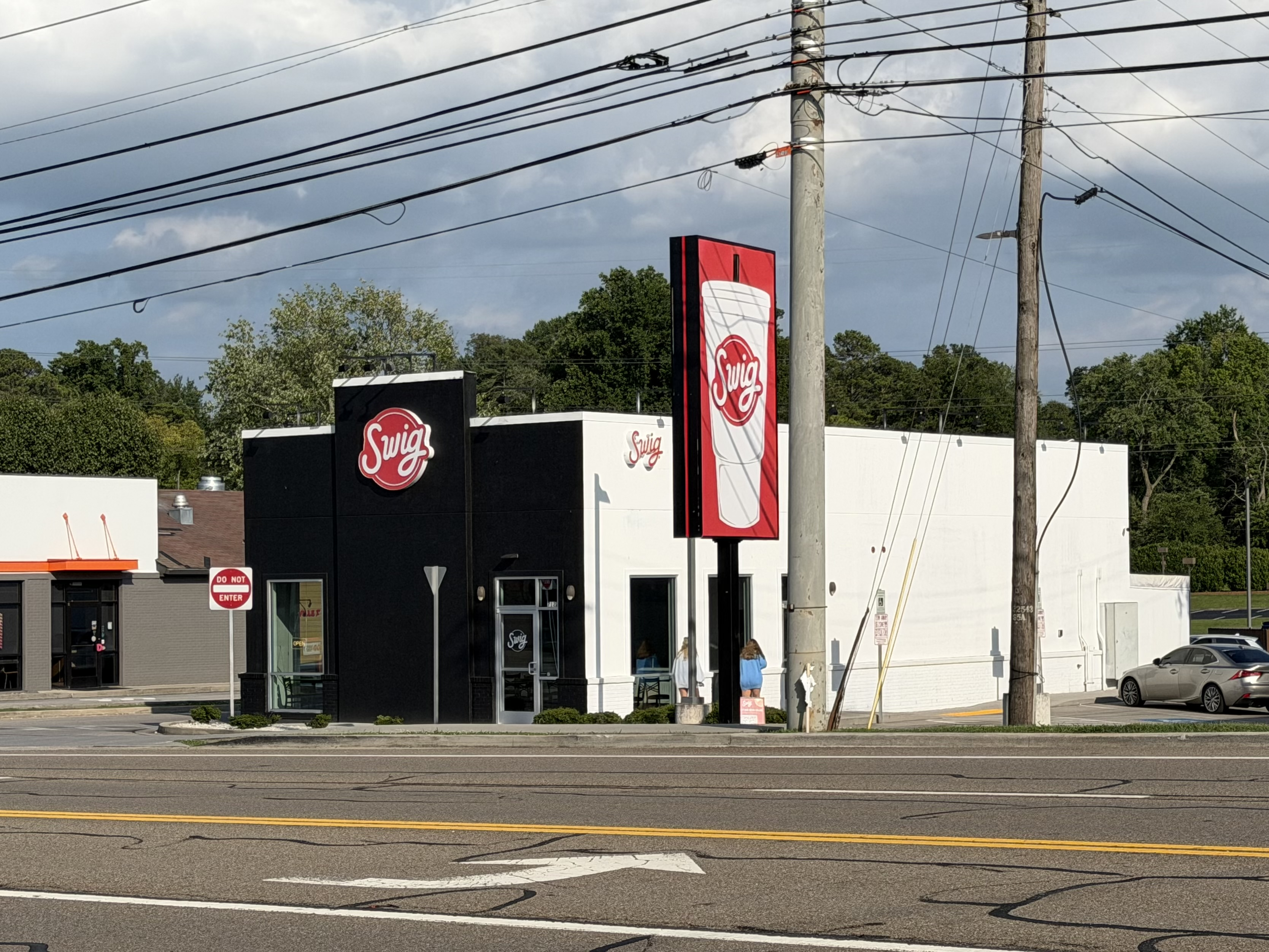
- A Swig location in Knoxville, Tennessee
- Founded: 2010; 16 years ago St. George, Utah
- Founders: Nicole Robison; Todd Tanner
- Headquarters: Sandy, Utah
- Number of locations: 164 (April 2026)
- Area served: United States
- Key people: Alex Dunn (CEO); Chase Wardrop (COO); Dylan Roeder (CMO)
- Products: Soft drinks, cookies, pretzel bites
- Number of employees: 500+ (2020)
- Parent: Larry H. Miller Company
- Website: www.swig.com

Swig is a drive-through soda-fountain chain primarily located in the western United States. The company was founded in April 2010 by Nicole Robison and her then-husband Todd Tanner in St. George, Utah. The brand is known for its popular "dirty sodas", soft drinks mixed with add-ins such as cream and flavored syrups. As of February 2026, the company operates locations in sixteen states. Swig's majority owner is Larry H. Miller Company (LHMCO), with the Savory Fund having a minority interest. As of 2018, the company headquarters was located in Lehi, Utah.

== History ==
Nicole Robison and her then-husband Todd Tanner founded Swig in 2010 as a drive-through specialty soda shop. The couple opened the business in St. George, Utah after arriving in the fall of 2009 from Colorado. The shop was located in a small space near Dixie State University (now Utah Tech University) and initially charged $1 to promote the unique style of soda.

In 2015, Swig sued competitor Sodalicious over their use of the term "dirty soda", which Swig claimed to have trademarked in 2013. Sodalicious argued that the term was generic and thus could not be trademarked. The lawsuit ended with an undisclosed settlement in 2017.

By 2017, Swig had 16 locations and more franchise offers from outside of Utah. The same year, Robison sold the chain to the restaurant management firm Four Foods Group. Also in 2017, Savory Fund acquired a majority stake in the business. Within five years of the ownership change, Swig expanded to 40 locations. In 2021, Swig expanded into Idaho, Oklahoma, and Texas.

Rian McCartan was named CEO of Swig in October 2022. McCartan had previously held an executive position at See's Candy. The following month, the Larry H. Miller Company (LHMCO) became the majority owner of Swig, with Savory Fund retaining equity and an operational role in the business. Robison, Chase Wardrop, and Dylan Roeder also retained minority equity in the chain.

Alex Dunn, a managing partner at LHMCO, succeeded McCartan as Swig's CEO in 2024.

As of June 2024, Swig had 81 locations in seven states. As of 2024, Swig had contracts to open about 500 stores within five to seven years. The company planned to open new locations in Idaho, Texas, the Midwest, the Carolinas, and Florida.

== Products ==
Swig is known for their "dirty" sodas, which are made by mixing base name-brand sodas such as Coca-Cola or Dr Pepper with add-ins such as flavored syrups, creams, and fruit-purees. Swig also sells non-soda beverages and energy drinks fortified with extra caffeine. The chain has a limited food menu that includes sugar cookies, pretzel bites, and limited time offer treats.

== Franchises ==
In 2023, Swig announced that it would open 25 corporate-owned locations and start a franchising program. Megaplex Theatres began selling Swig products in 2023. As of September 2023, Swig had plans to open roughly 250 new locations in Florida, North Carolina, South Carolina, Tennessee, Arkansas, Missouri and Idaho.

In late 2023, Swig announced that it was expanding into San Antonio, Texas, with two locations. In early 2024, Swig announced the opening of a third San Antonio location in the Alamo City neighborhood. In 2023, Arkansas opened its first franchise location in Rogers.

As of 2024, opening a Swig shop demanded an initial investment between $504,900 and $1.1 million, as detailed in its franchise disclosure document. In 2023, company-owned store revenues ranged from $574,553 to $1.65 million. In 2023, Swig launched 14 new stores, including two franchised locations.

== In culture ==
In December 2021, pop singer Olivia Rodrigo posted a photograph of herself holding a Swig cup on Instagram, causing the brand to go viral on various social media platforms, including TikTok. In 2024, Swig experienced another surge in popularity due to its prominence on the television show The Secret Lives of Mormon Wives. The chain was initially surprised by the attention from the show, but quickly leveraged it for marketing purposes.

Prior to reaching internet virality, "dirty soda" brands like Swig had already gained a strong following in the mountain states. The drink's popularity in the region is partly due to the fact that many members of the Church of Jesus Christ of Latter-day Saints abstain from alcohol and coffee, making soft drinks a common alternative.
