= The Ballpark at America First Square =

Home of the Salt Lake Bees since 2025

- Location in Utah Location in the United States Location in North America
- Interactive map of The Ballpark at America First Square
- Former names: Daybreak Field at America First Square (planning/construction stage)
- Address: 11111 Ballpark Drive
- Location: South Jordan, Utah, U.S.
- Coordinates: 40.5497°N 112.0225°W
- Elevation: 4,900 feet (1,490 m) AMSL
- Owner: Miller Sports + Entertainment
- Capacity: 6,500 (fixed seating); 8,000 (including berm seating)
- Surface: Natural grass
- Field size: Left field: 345 ft (105 m); Center field: 420 ft (128 m); Right field: 345 ft (105 m)

Construction
- Groundbreaking: October 19, 2023; 3 years ago
- Opened: April 8, 2025; 19 months ago

Tenant
- Salt Lake Bees (PCL) (2025–present)

The Ballpark at America First Square is a baseball stadium in the western United States, located in South Jordan, Utah, a suburb southwest of Salt Lake City. Opened in spring 2025, it is the home of the Triple-A Salt Lake Bees of the Pacific Coast League.

== Design and construction ==
In May 2023, the Larry H. Miller Company released renderings of The Ballpark at America First Square. The stadium was designed by HOK and was built by Okland Construction.

The Ballpark was designed to meet the requirements of major-league teams. Its design includes a 12,000-square-foot (1,100 m^{2}) clubhouse, training and player development areas, and multiple batting cages. It is the home of the Triple-A Salt Lake Bees of the Pacific Coast League. The Ballpark replaced the Bees' former home, Smith's Ballpark, where the team played since its founding in 1994.

By October 17, 2024, the playing grass was fully installed. The right- and left-field walls are 345 feet (105 m) from home plate along the foul line, and the distance from home to the center-field wall is 420 feet (128 m). The diamond is oriented east to provide a view of the Wasatch Mountains, and the approximate elevation at street level is 4,900 feet (1,490 m) above sea level.

The Ballpark is smaller than the Bees' former home stadium, with a seating capacity of 8,000; Smith's Ballpark was roughly double this size. The Ballpark also has more premium seating.

The area immediately surrounding the stadium is set aside for the construction of 900 apartments, 100,000 square feet (9,300 m^{2}) of office space, and 75,000 sq ft (7,000 m^{2}) of retail space.

The Ballpark includes better facilities for players than Smith's Ballpark. Each team has two batting cages, and the facility includes male and female locker rooms for umpires and coaches.

In late 2025, The Ballpark was given the Award of Merit by Engineering News-Record.

== Transportation ==
The Utah Transit Authority built the South Jordan Downtown station on the TRAX Red Line to serve the stadium. The City of South Jordan, the Utah Department of Transportation, and the Larry H. Miller Company aimed to reduce the impact of the stadium on local traffic. Access points were constructed to allow cars to enter the stadium's parking lot from Mountain View Corridor.

To help alleviate local traffic caused by games at the ballpark, UDOT added Texas U-turns to the nearby Mountain View Corridor. These traffic features allow drivers to make a U-turn on the highway without having to pass through intersections with traffic lights, with the goal of keeping baseball patrons off local roads. Trails are planned to encourage access via foot and bicycle.

== Ownership ==
The stadium is a privately funded venture by the Larry H. Miller Company, owners of the Bees. The cost of the stadium was $140 million. It is part of a larger mixed-use entertainment district within the master-planned Daybreak community, which is expected to take more than 15 years to complete.

Events and tenants
Preceded by Smith's Ballpark	Home of the Salt Lake Bees; 2025–present	Succeeded by Current
