= Peter Holt =

American businessman and recipient of the Purple Heart medal

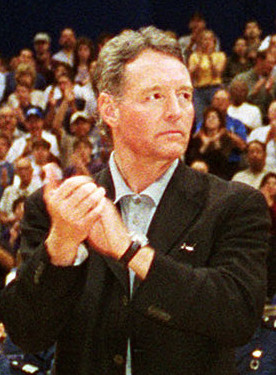
- Holt in 2000
- Born: July 26, 1948 (age 77); Peoria, Illinois, US
- Occupations: Former owner of the San Antonio Spurs, former CEO of HoltCat
- Awards: Five-time NBA Champion; Two-time NBA G League Champion

Peter M. Holt (born July 26, 1948) is an American businessman. He is the former CEO of HoltCat, the largest Caterpillar dealership in the United States and former chairman, CEO, and owner of Spurs Sports & Entertainment, which owns the NBA's San Antonio Spurs, the USL's San Antonio FC, the AHL's San Antonio Rampage, and the NBA G League's Austin Spurs.

== Early life and military career ==
Holt is the great-grandson of Benjamin Holt, who developed the first practical track-type tractor in 1904. His family's history in San Antonio, Texas began in 1933, when his great-uncle, William K. Holt, moved to San Antonio to start a Caterpillar dealership. As he had no heirs, Bill invited B.D. Holt (Peter's father) to get involved in the business. In 1961, B.D. Holt moved to Corpus Christi, Texas and started his own Caterpillar dealership.

Holt was born in Peoria, Illinois. He lived in San Antonio as a child before moving to Corpus Christi. After graduating high school in Corpus Christi, Holt went into the United States Army, serving two years, including a one-year tour of duty as an infantryman in Vietnam. He ended his military duty as a sergeant with a Silver Star, three Bronze Stars, and a Purple Heart.

== Early business career ==
Upon leaving the army, Holt went to California, working for an investment banking house and became involved in a bar and restaurant business. Holt rejoined his father in 1983 to work in Corpus Christi at his Caterpillar dealership. Holt diversified the dealership's markets, growing it to its size today. In September 1987, Holt and his father purchased Holt Machinery Co. in San Antonio, reuniting the original Caterpillar dealership that his great-uncle started in 1933. Holt would in 2002 expand the company's Texas presence by purchasing Darr Equipment Company of Dallas, a Caterpillar dealer in the DFW Metroplex. His son Peter John Holt and daughter Corinna Holt Richter have shared the reins at Holt Cat since 2018.

== Sports franchise ownership ==
In 1993, Holt decided to invest in the San Antonio Spurs, wanting to help keep the team in San Antonio. He and his wife Julianna became the team's principal owners.

Holt and the Spurs organization later purchased other franchises – the Austin Toros of the NBA Development League, the San Antonio Rampage of the American Hockey League, and the renamed San Antonio Silver Stars of the WNBA. With each purchase, the team colors were changed to silver and black, the motif used by the Spurs.

To keep the team in San Antonio, Holt led a successful effort to build a new arena, the AT&T Center, through a ballot measure that would provide public funding for its construction. The new home to the Spurs and the San Antonio Livestock Exposition broke ground in August 2000 and opened for the 2002 season. During his tenure as owner, the Spurs won five championships in 1999, 2003, 2005, 2007, and 2014.

Holt retired in 2016, and his wife, Julianna, succeeded him. His son Peter J. Holt has since succeeded his mother.

== Personal life ==
Holt served as Chairman of the United Way of San Antonio and Bexar County. He is a member of the World presidents’ Organization, and is a trustee of the Palmer Drug Abuse Program. He also served as chairman of the board of St. Mary's Hall, a private school in San Antonio.

A frequent contributor to the Republican Party, Holt has contributed over $500,000 to the campaigns of Governor Rick Perry, who appointed Holt as a commissioner of the Texas Department of Parks and Wildlife. A strong supporter of international trade, Holt is a board member of Free Trade Alliance-San Antonio, as well as the San Antonio Economic Development Foundation and Chase Bank-San Antonio. According to documents obtained by the San Antonio Express-News, Julianna Hawn Holt filed for divorce December 22, 2017 in Bexar County District Court.

Holt was inducted to the Texas Business Hall of Fame in 2004.

== Awards and honors ==
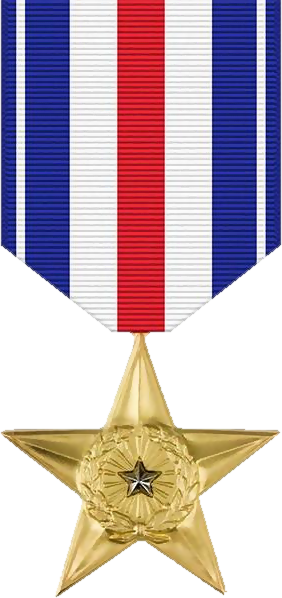
Holt is a Silver Star recipient for his military service

Military

- Silver Star
- Three Bronze Stars
- Purple Heart

Business

- CAT Circle of Excellence Award winner
- Texas Business Hall of Fame inductee (class of 2004)
- 2014 USAA/NaVOBA Vetrepreneur of The Year Award winner

Sports ownership

- Five-time NBA Champion (as owner of the San Antonio Spurs – 1999, 2003, 2005, 2007, 2014)
- Two-time NBA G League Champion (as owner of the Austin Spurs) – 2012, 2018

Other

- 2001 Golden Plate Award of the American Academy of Achievement

Sporting positions
Preceded by Red McCombs	San Antonio Spurs owner 1993–2016	Succeeded by Peter J. Holt
Preceded by Larry H. Miller (as Utah Starzz)	San Antonio Super Stars/Stars owner 2003–2017	Succeeded by William Hornbuckle (as Las Vegas Aces)
