= Lids (store) =

American hat company

Hat World, Inc.

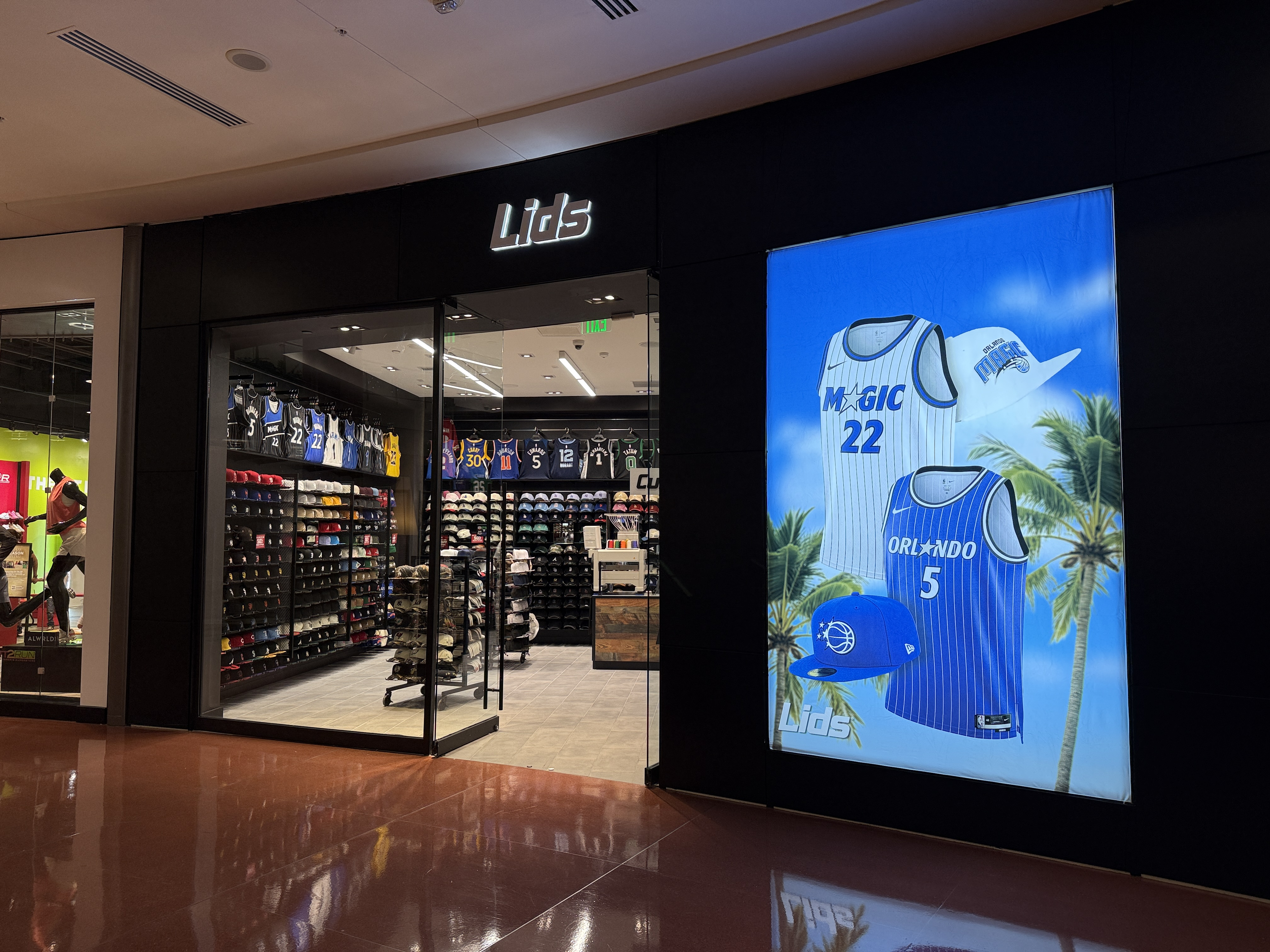
- Lids store in Orlando, FL
- Trade name: Lids Sports Group
- Type: Subsidiary
- Industry: Retail, Textile
- Founded: 1995; 31 years ago
- Headquarters: Indianapolis, Indiana, US
- Number of locations: 2,000
- Area served: List: United States; Canada; France; Netherlands; Puerto Rico; United Kingdom; Australia
- Key people: List: Tom Ripley (CEO of Lids); Bob Durda (President); George Berger (co-founder, original Chairman and executive of Hat World, Inc.); Glenn Campbell (co-founder and executive of Hat World, Inc.); Scott Molander(co-founder and executive of Hat World, Inc.); Conner White (co-founder of Lids); Ben Fischman (co-founder of Lids); Douglass Karp (co-founder of Lids); Meek Mill (co-owner); Ken Wilson (DSM Central PA)
- Products: Headwear; Novelties; Apparel; Sporting goods
- Parent: Genesco (2004–18); Ames Watson, LLC & Fanatics, Inc. (2018–present)
- Divisions: List: Lids Locker Room; Lids Clubhouse; Lids U (formerly FLC - Fanatics Lids College); Lids Macy's
- Website: lids.com

Hat World, Inc. (doing business as Lids Sports Group) is an American retailer specializing in athletic headwear. It primarily operates under the Lids brand with stores in the U.S., Puerto Rico, Canada, Australia, France, Germany, and the United Kingdom plus various websites. The majority of the stores operate in shopping malls and factory outlet centers.

== History ==
Lids Corp. was founded in Boston by Douglass Karp (son of real estate developer Stephen R. Karp) and Ben Fischman (son of real estate developer Steven Fischman) in 1993. Hat World, Inc. was founded in 1995 by George Berger, Glenn Campbell and Scott Molander, with its headquarters office in Sioux Falls, SD.

Hat World's first store opened on November 3, 1995, in the Tippecanoe Mall in Lafayette, Indiana. The second store opened at Muncie Mall in Muncie, Indiana. The company's operations and warehouse were located in Indianapolis. The administrative headquarters was later moved from Sioux Falls to Indianapolis. The original Lids Corp. filed for bankruptcy protection in 2001 and certain Lids stores, the tradename/trademark and other assets were acquired by Hat World, Inc., which subsequently changed its store names from "Hat World" to "Lids."

Hat World, Inc. (dba the new "Lids") was acquired in April 2004 by footwear retailer Genesco Inc.

In 2018 Genesco sold Hat World/Lids to "FanzzLids Holdings", a joint venture between Ames Watson, LLC, and Fanatics, Inc. (minority investment) for $100 million in cash. Also in 2019, rapper Meek Mill acquired an ownership stake.

In 2019 Lids acquired Fanzz. In 2024, Fanatics, Inc. became the majority owner of Lids Holdings.
