= Smith's Ballpark =

Minor League Baseball Stadium in Salt Lake City

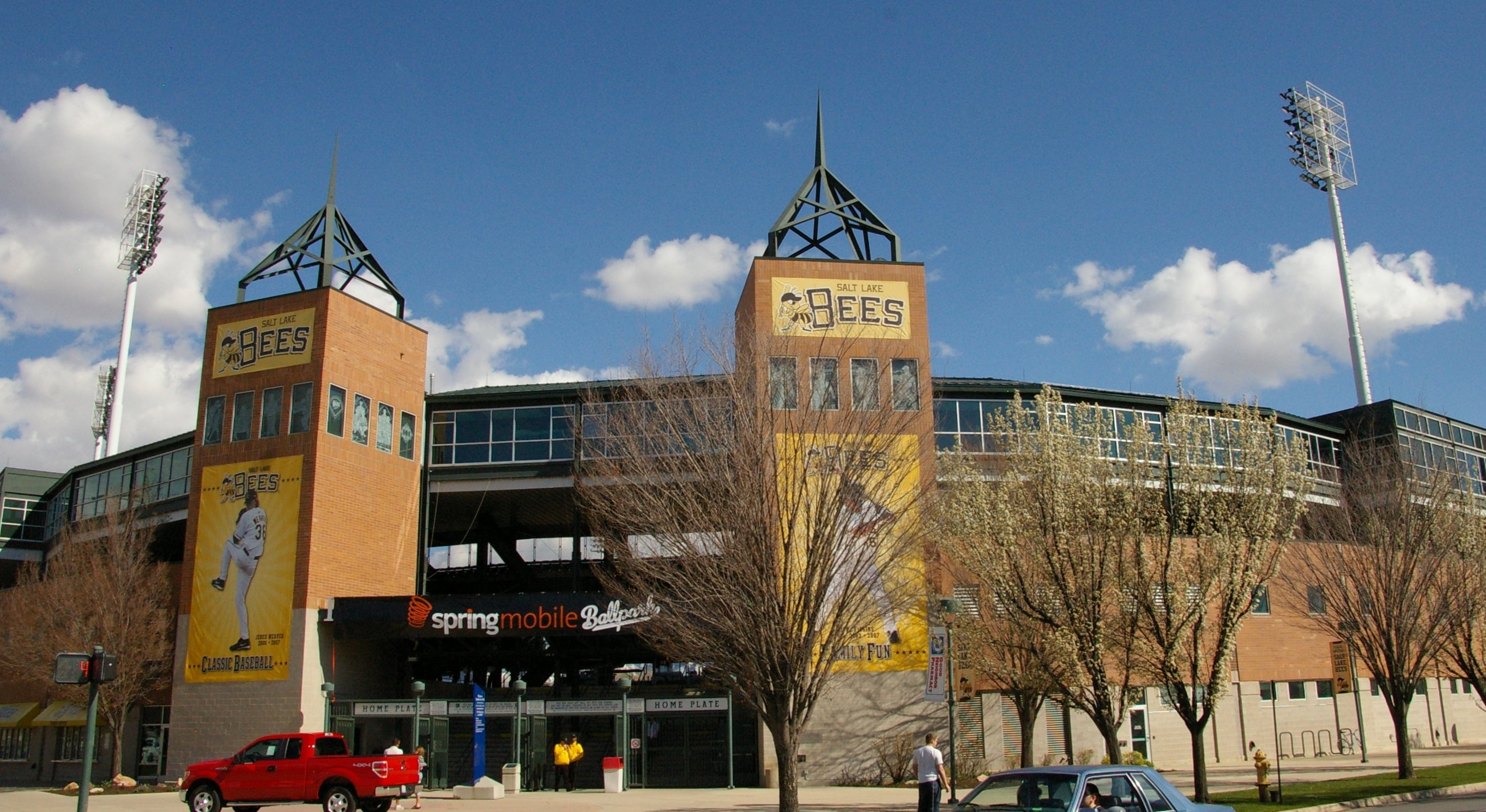
- April 2009

- Location in Utah Location in the United States Location in North America
- Interactive map of Smith's Ballpark
- Former names: Franklin Quest Field (1994–July 1998); Franklin Covey Field (July 1998–2009); Spring Mobile Ballpark (2009–2014)
- Address: 1365 South West Temple; Salt Lake City, Utah; United States
- Coordinates: 40.741°N 111.893°W
- Elevation: 4,230 feet (1,290 m) AMSL
- Owner: City of Salt Lake City
- Operator: Miller Sports + Entertainment (Salt Lake Bees)
- Capacity: 14,511
- Surface: Natural grass
- Record attendance: 16,531 (July 22, 2000, vs. Albuquerque)
- Field size: Left field: 345 ft (105 m); Left-center field: 385 ft (117 m); Center field: 420 ft (128 m); Right-center field: 375 ft (114 m); Right field: 315 ft (96 m)
- Public transit: Ballpark station

Construction
- Groundbreaking: May 19, 1993; 33 years ago
- Opened: April 11, 1994; 32 years ago 32 years ago
- Cost: $23 million ($50 million in 2025)
- Architects: Populous and Valentiner, Crane, Brunjes & Onyon
- Structural engineer: H/T Engineers
- Services engineers: Bredson & Associates
- General contractor: Sahara Construction

Tenants
- Salt Lake Bees (PCL) (1994–2024); Utah Utes baseball (Big 12) (1994–2025)

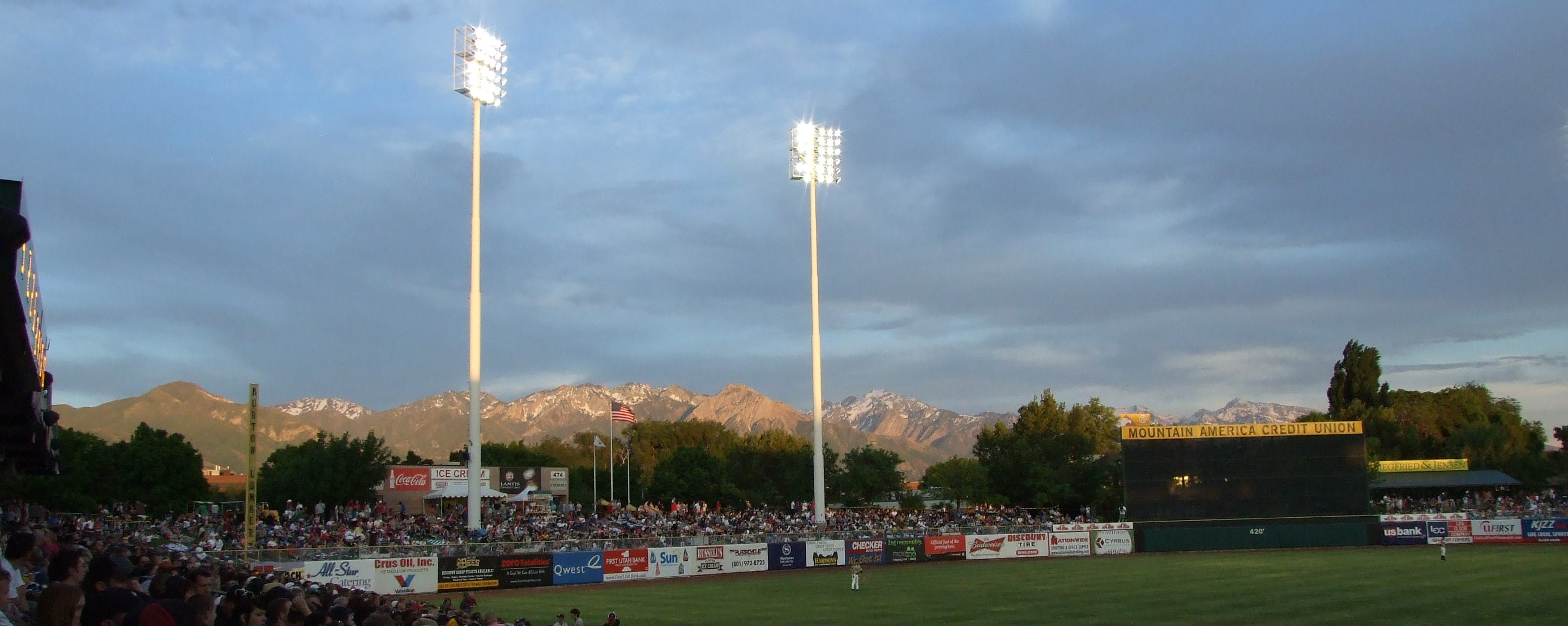
Smith's Ballpark at sunset in 2009

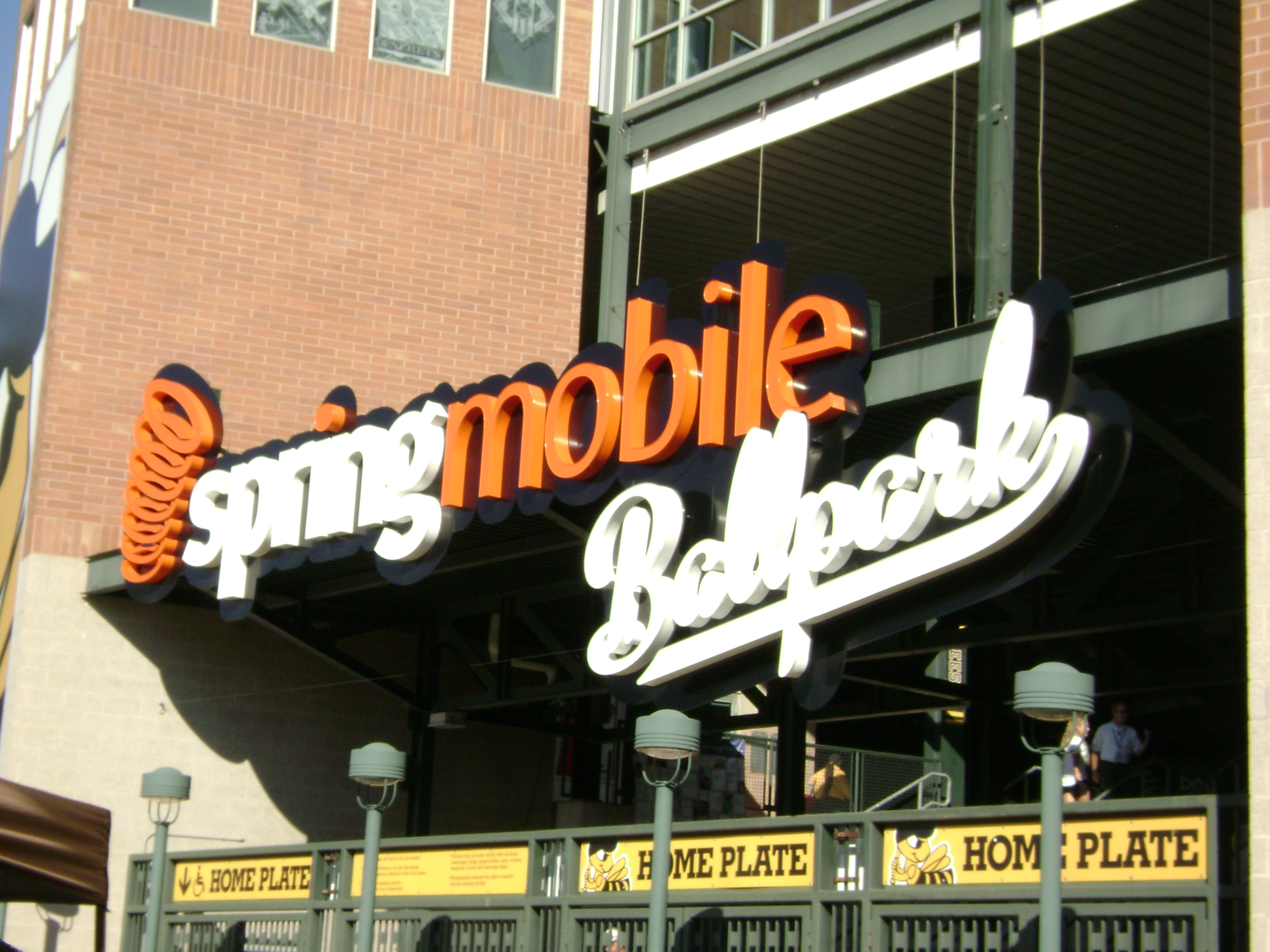
An entrance gate in 2013

Smith's Ballpark (formerly known as Franklin Quest Field, later Franklin Covey Field, and more recently Spring Mobile Ballpark) is a baseball park in Salt Lake City, Utah. It was the home field of the minor league Salt Lake Bees of the Pacific Coast League and the collegiate Utah Utes of the Big 12 Conference.

== History ==
Smith's Ballpark opened in 1994 with a seating capacity of 15,400, the largest in the Pacific Coast League. It is located on the site of its predecessor, Derks Field, with a similar unorthodox southeast alignment, toward the Wasatch Range. Derks Field was originally known as Community Field. The approximate elevation at street level is 4,230 feet (1,290 m) above sea level.

In its first season in 1994, the Buzz set a PCL attendance record with 713,224 fans. The team led the PCL in attendance in each of its first six seasons in Salt Lake. The largest crowd at the ballpark is 16,531 in 2000; the Saturday night opponent was the Albuquerque Dukes on July 22.

Besides hosting the Salt Lake Bees, Smith's Ballpark has played host to two exhibition games featuring the Minnesota Twins, a spring training game featuring the Seattle Mariners and the Colorado Rockies, concerts, soccer matches, and high school and college baseball games, including a Mountain West Conference tournament.

The ballpark has hosted the Triple-A All-Star Game twice. In 1996, a team of National League-affiliated All-Stars defeated their American League opponents, 2–1. Salt Lake's Todd Walker was selected as the PCL MVP. The game returned to the park in 2011 with the International League All-Stars beating the PCL team, 3–0.

In January 2023, the Larry H. Miller Company, owner of the Salt Lake Bees, announced that they would be building a privately financed stadium in the Daybreak section of suburban South Jordan, Utah, with a planned opening in the spring of 2025, ending a 31-year run at Smith's Ballpark.

In April 2023, the University of Utah announced plans to explore a fundraising drive for the construction of a new ballpark for the Utah Utes baseball program on the site of their current practice facility. The move—which could be completed as early as 2025—would relocate the Utes program from Smith's Ballpark to the new facility.

On June 21, 2023, Bees outfielder Jo Adell hit a 514-foot home run at the ballpark, the longest home run ever hit – in either minor or major league baseball – since Statcast tracking started in 2015.

The Bees left Smith's Ballpark for The Ballpark at America First Square, a new stadium in South Jordan, Utah, after the 2024 season.

== Naming rights ==
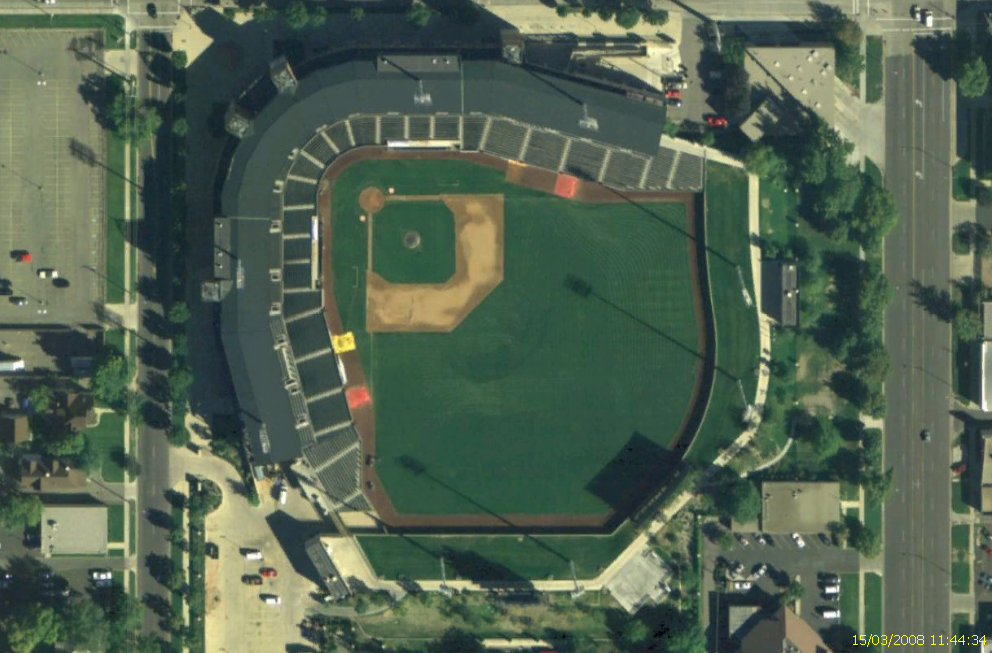
Franklin Covey Field

When the ballpark opened in 1994, it was called Franklin Quest Field, for which the Franklin Quest Company paid $1.4 million in the summer of 1993 for 15 years of naming rights.

On April 7, 2009, the Bees announced that they had reached a multi-year naming-rights deal with Spring Mobile (a Salt Lake City-based AT&T authorized retailer) to provide the ballpark's new name of Spring Mobile Ballpark which ran for five seasons.

In March 2014, it was announced that Salt Lake City-based Smith's Food and Drug had signed a six-year naming rights deal, giving the park its current name.

== Features ==
Smith's Ballpark is noted for its views of the Wasatch Mountains over the left and center field walls.

== Redevelopment ==
In early 2024, the Miller family foundation announced a $22 million donation to Salt Lake City's Ballpark NEXT fund. This fund, managed by Salt Lake City, is conducting a $100-million program to improve the neighborhood, including and surrounding Smith's Ballpark.

In late 2025, Salt Lake City approved detailed redevelopment plans for Smith's Ballpark and the surrounding neighborhood.

On May 30, 2026, Smith's Ballpark was the site of the Salt Lake Music Festival.

== See also ==
- List of NCAA Division I baseball venues
- List of Pacific Coast League stadiums

Events and tenants
Preceded by First stadium	Home of the Salt Lake Bees; 1994–2024	Succeeded by The Ballpark at America First Square
