= Miller Sports + Entertainment =

Sports management company

- Industry: Sports management
- Founded: 2024; 2 years ago
- Founder: Gail Miller
- Headquarters: Sandy, Utah
- Parent: Larry H. Miller Company
- Website: https://millerse.com/

Miller Sports + Entertainment (MSE) is the sports and entertainment division of the Larry H. Miller Company, an American firm based in Utah. MSE oversees LHMCO's interests in Megaplex Theatres, Real Salt Lake, the Salt Lake Bees, the Utah Royals, and other related enterprises.

== History ==
Larry H. Miller purchased the Utah Jazz in 1985 for $22 million. The Larry H. Miller Company sold the Jazz in 2020 to Ryan Smith for $1.6 billion.

Larry Miller purchased the Salt Lake Golden Eagles, a minor league ice hockey team in the International Hockey League, in 1989 and sold the team in 1994.

In 1997, Larry Miller was awarded the franchise for the Utah Starzz of the Women's National Basketball Association. In 2002, Miller sold the team to Spurs Sports & Entertainment.

In April 2023, MSE formed Big League Utah to attract a Major League Baseball team to Utah.

The Miller Sports + Entertainment company spun was re-branded from the Larry H. Miller Company in May 2024.

On April 18, 2025, Miller Sports + Entertainment and the Miller family acquired the Real Monarchs, Utah Royals, and Real Salt Lake (RSL), in a $600 million deal. The teams are all owned and operated under RSL Football Holdings. In July 2025, MSE added local investors to RSL Football Holdings, including Matt Hawkins, Nick Greer, Jeremy and Kristin Andrus and the Don Berman family.

== Businesses ==
=== Megaplex Theatres ===
Megaplex Theatres is a cinema chain based in Sandy, Utah. It was founded in 1999 is owned by the Larry H. Miller Company and run by MSE. As of 2024, Megaplex Theatres operated 17 locations. The first location anchored the newly built Jordan Commons restaurant and entertainment complex in Sandy when it opened on November 1, 1999, with 20 screens. The theater was built on the former site of Jordan High School. Since its opening, the Sandy location has grown to be one of the highest-grossing theaters locally while also ranking among the top theaters nationwide on some films.

=== Sports ===
==== Salt Lake Bees ====
This franchise dates from 1994, when Joe Buzas, a former major league player and the owner of the PCL Portland Beavers, moved the team to Salt Lake City. Buzas made a deal wherein the city would build a new ballpark on the site of historic Derks Field in exchange for relocating the team. The new ballpark, Franklin Quest Field, opened in 1994 with the renamed Salt Lake Buzz drawing 713,224 fans to home games during their inaugural season—breaking the PCL single-season attendance record that had stood for 48 years. Buzas owned the team until his death in 2003. The team was purchased by Larry H. Miller, who also owned the NBA's Utah Jazz. Miller died in February 2009, and the team is owned by his widow, Gail Miller. Known as the Salt Lake Buzz from 1994 to 2000, the team changed its name to the Salt Lake Stingers in 2001. The change was forced by a trademark dilution lawsuit filed by Georgia Tech, whose yellowjacket mascot is named Buzz.

MSE oversees The Ballpark at America First Square, the home stadium for the Salt Lake Bees, which it has owned since 2005. The stadium was unveiled in 2024 and is part of the larger Daybreak (community).

==== Real Salt Lake ====
In April 2025, LHMCO acquired a controlling interest in Real Salt Lake of Major League Soccer (MLS), the Utah Royals of the National Women's Soccer League (NWSL), and America First Field from David Blitzer and Ryan Smith for $600 million.

== Teams ==
=== Current ===
Team	Sport	League	Year acquired
Big League Utah	Baseball	Major League Baseball (pursuing future team)	2023
Real Monarchs	Soccer	MLS Next Pro	2025
Real Salt Lake	Soccer	Major League Soccer	2025
Salt Lake Bees	Baseball	Pacific Coast League (Triple-A)	2005
Utah Royals	Women's Soccer	National Women's Soccer League	2025

=== Former ===
Team	Sport	League	Years
Salt Lake City Stars	Basketball	NBA G League	2015–2020
Salt Lake Golden Eagles	Ice Hockey	International Hockey League	1989–1994
Utah Jazz	Basketball	National Basketball Association	1985–2020
Utah Starzz	Women's Basketball	Women's National Basketball Association	1997–2002
