= Megaplex Theatres =

Cinema chain based in Sandy, Utah

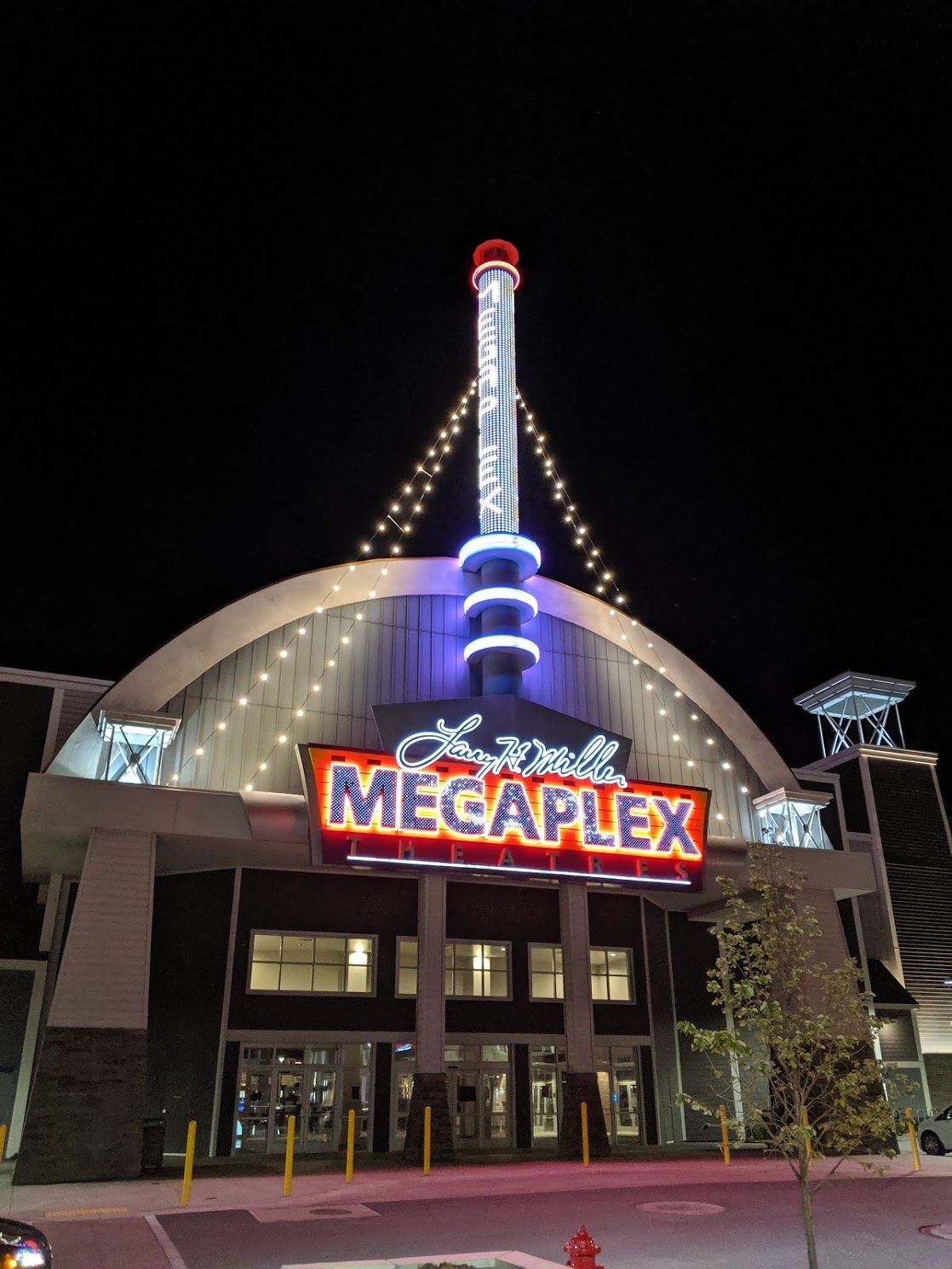
- Megaplex Theatres at Geneva
- Type: Private
- Industry: Entertainment
- Founded: 1999; 27 years ago
- Founders: Larry H. Miller
- Headquarters: Sandy, Utah, U.S.
- Number of locations: 17
- Key people: Britten Maughan (President)
- Owner: Miller Sports + Entertainment
- Website: megaplex.com

Megaplex Theatres is an American cinema chain based in Sandy, Utah. It was founded in 1999 by the late Larry H. Miller. It is owned and managed by the Larry H. Miller Company. Megaplex Theatres operates numerous locations in Utah and Nevada.

== History ==
The first Megaplex Theatres location anchored the Jordan Commons restaurant and entertainment complex in Sandy. It opened on November 1, 1999, with 20 screens and was built on the former site of Jordan High School. Since its opening, the Sandy location has become one of the highest-grossing theaters locally and ranks among the top theaters nationwide for some films. Jordan High School had been on the site for over 100 years but fell into disrepair, and the local school district was unable to bring it up to code. Larry H. Miller developed the site at the request of the mayor.

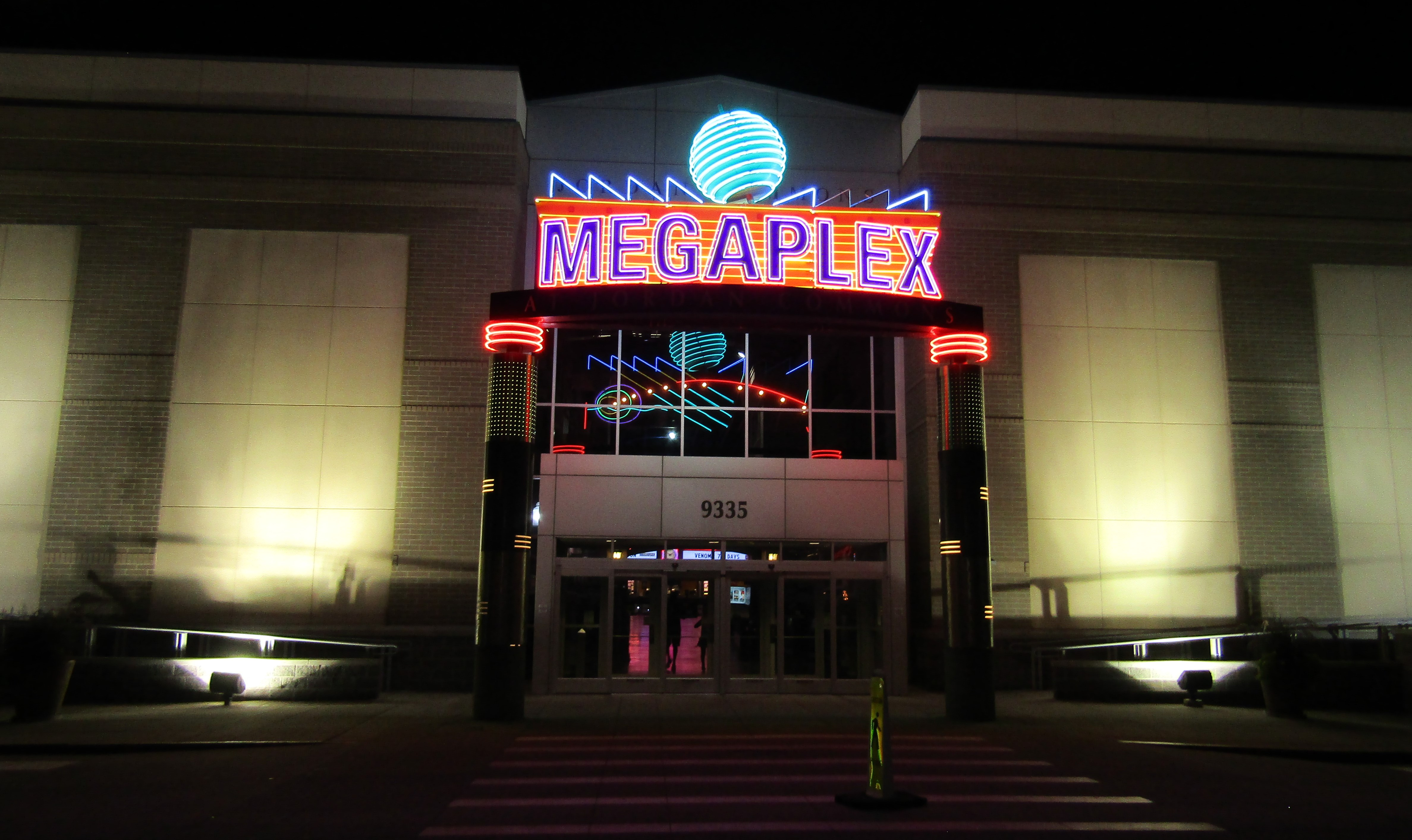
Megaplex at Jordan Commons

In September 2005, the location in Sandy opened the second IMAX auditorium in Utah. Megaplex has since added IMAX screens at locations in South Jordan, West Valley City, Centerville, and Vineyard. In April 2012, the chain announced its expansion beyond the Wasatch Front with the purchase of 11 theaters from Westates Theatres. The sale included four theaters in St. George, three in Logan, two in Cedar City, and one in Mesquite, Nevada. The expansion added 71 screens and 11,968 seats to Megaplex Theatres' capacity. It had previously been operating 84 screens at six locations. Financial terms were not disclosed.

In September 2013, the chain announced plans to build a new location in Vineyard as part of a development on the former site of Geneva Steel. The theater has 13 screens including the chain's fifth IMAX auditorium which opened on March 13, 2015. In 2019, Megaplex started offering a subscription service, MegaPass.

During the COVID pandemic, Megaplex temporarily closed and started limited screenings with social distancing. It also sold popcorn to go from the curb. In 2020, Megaplex announced plans for construction of a theater in Idaho Falls, Idaho. In 2021, Megaplex launched "Megaplex Luxury Theatres." Megaplex Luxury Theatres have heated luxury seats, in-seat dining, and private meeting space. This new branding was partially in response to the COVID-19 pandemic.

Due to the large Latter-day Saint population in Utah, Megaplex Theatres often shows religious films including T.C. Christensen's The Fighting Preacher. The Larry H. Miller Company acquired Swig, a dirty soda chain, on November 22, 2022. Swig began sales at Megaplex Theatres in 2023. The Megaplex Theatres location at The Gateway was a venue for the Sundance Film Festival in 2023.

In 2023, Megaplex Theatres expanded its Kids Summer Movies program by giving free admission to children from families which receive public food benefits. The program covers one adult per family. The regular Megaplex Kids Summer Movies pass is unaffected. As of 2023, a $10 pass entitles one guest to attend as many as ten family-friendly movies over the summer. The program includes "sensory friendly" showings designed for autistic children and others with sensory sensitivity. The showings allow guests to stand, move, and make noise as they feel the need to make themselves comfortable.

Megaplex Theatres was ranked the 25th largest cinema chain in North America according to Boxoffice PRO's Giants of Exhibition 2023 with 15 locations and 173 screens.

As of 2024, the Larry H. Miller Company was carrying out a program to renovate several Megaplex Theatres locations in Utah. Improvements include luxury reclining seats, "quiet rooms," new projectors, and improved sound systems. As of March 2024, renovations were complete at the Ogden Megaplex with work underway in St. George, Vineyard, and Centerville.

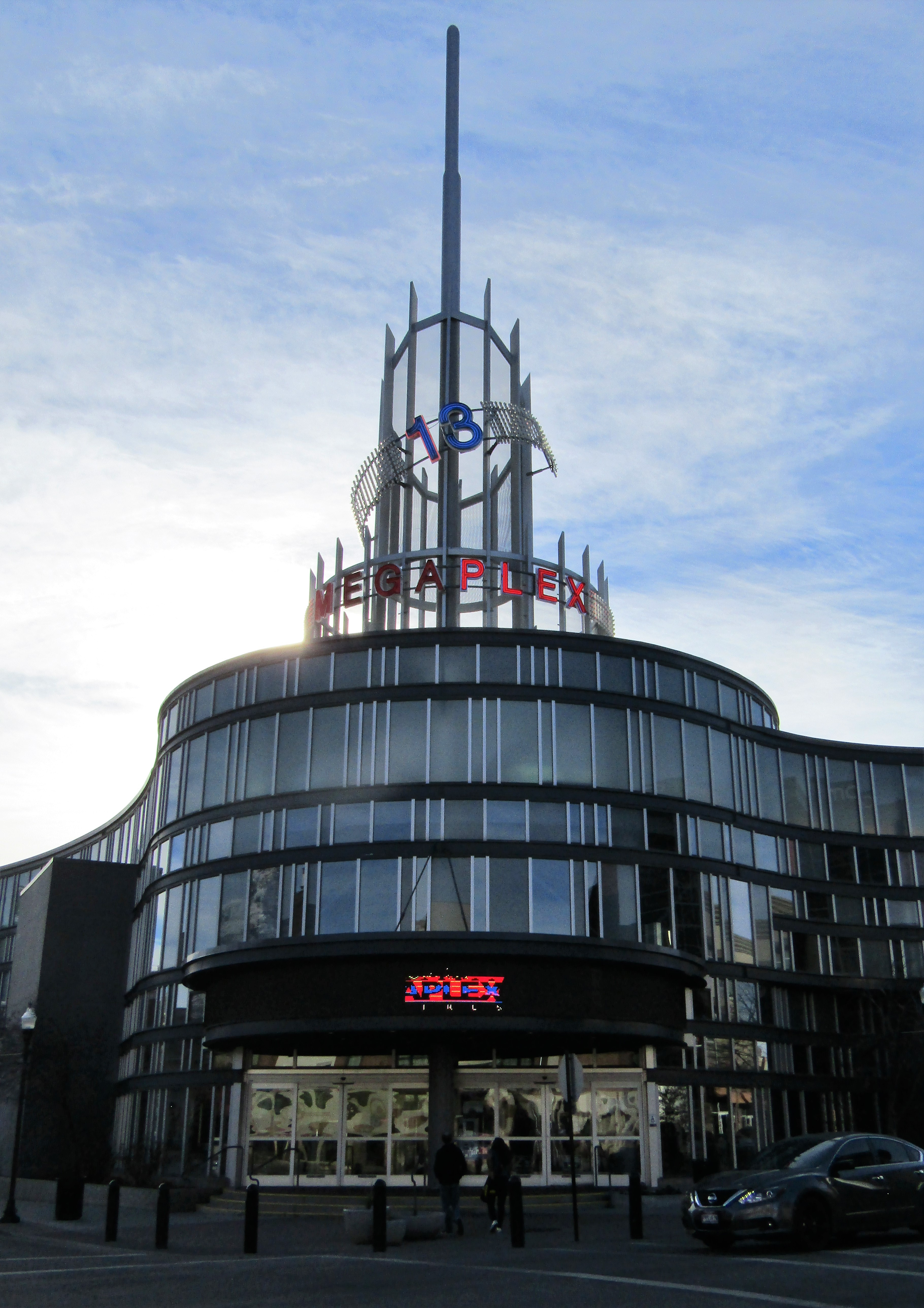
Megaplex Theatres Ogden

In April of 2024, Megaplex Theatres announced that it had acquired the site of Redstone Cinema 8 at Kimball Junction in Park City, Utah. Megaplex plans to renovate the site with an eye towards luxury. The acquisition occurred after Redstone filed for bankruptcy.

Megaplex Theatres acquired the Water Gardens Theatres in Pleasant Grove, Utah. This location was built in 1997. The theaters were being rebranded and renovated with a scheduled opening date of late 2024. This acquisition brought Megaplex's offerings to 187 screens at 17 locations.

As of 2024, Megaplex Theatres was working with the Theater Sports Network to bring live sporting events to its screens.

In October 2024, Megaplex Theaters announced that it would add a new location in St. George, Utah, at The Paseo.

In November 2024, Megaplex re-opened Redstone Theatre at Kimball Junction in Park City after completing major upgrades. These upgrades included new seating, remodeled restrooms, Dolby Atmos, and better concession stands.

In November 2024, Megaplex re-opened the rebranded location at Water Gardens in Pleasant Grove, Utah.

As of November 2024, Megaplex operated 17 theaters.

In 2025, Megaplex Theaters launched a rebrand. The rebrand was done with the assistance of the agency Matchistic. The rebrand included new visual and verbal identities. It also included upgrading theaters to include amenities such as heated luxury recliners, luxury box seats, quiet rooms, and large-format laser projectors.

As of May 2025, the University Stadium 6 location in Logan, Utah was undergoing extensive remodeling. Renovations included new screens, projectors, luxury seating, Dolby Atmos sound, and improved concession stands.

== Megaplex Entertainment ==
Megaplex Entertainment centers are an expansion of the Megaplex brand. These centers will include movie theaters but will also have other amenities such as bowling alleys, video arcades, restaurants, and spaces for private events.

The first Megaplex Entertainment center opened in South Jordan's Daybreak development in 2025. The Megaplex Downtown Daybreak location features eight large format auditoriums with luxury seating, Dolby Atmos sound, laser projectors, food and drink service; a bowling alley with 18 lanes, laneside dining, and augmented-reality technology; a variety of other food and beverage offerings; other games; a private event space; and a room for mothers.

Megaplex worked with Intercard for its arcade offerings.
