= Larry H. Miller =

American businessman (1944–2009)

Larry Miller
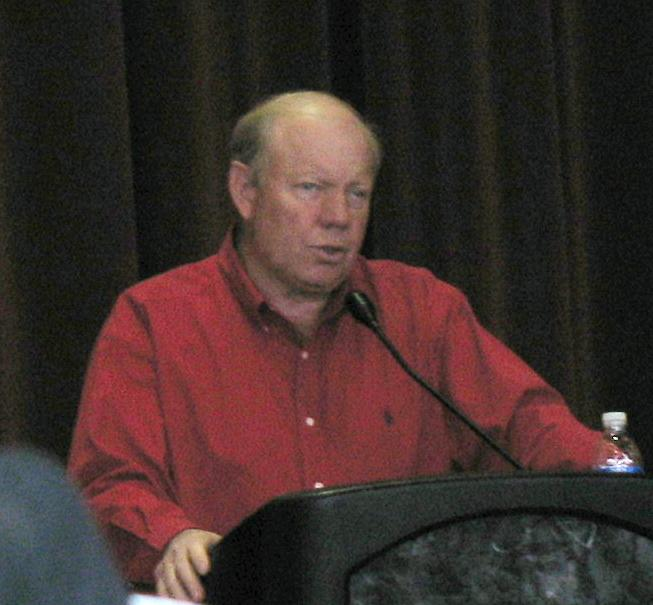
- Miller in 2006
- Born: Lawrence Horne West; April 26, 1944; Salt Lake City, Utah, U.S.
- Died: February 20, 2009 (aged 64); Salt Lake City, Utah, U.S.
- Resting place: Salt Lake City Cemetery; 40°46′37.92″N 111°51′28.8″W
- Occupation: Entrepreneur
- Spouse: Gail Miller (m. 1965)
- Website: The Larry Miller Group

Larry H. Miller (April 26, 1944 – February 20, 2009) was an American businessman. He owned the National Basketball Association's (NBA) Utah Jazz and the Salt Lake Bees, a minor league baseball team. Miller and his companies, now known as the Larry H. Miller Company, also owned more than 60 car dealerships throughout the western United States, and a variety of other ventures, including Prestige Financial Services, Jordan Commons (a restaurant and entertainment complex), Megaplex Theatres, KJZZ-TV, Miller Motorsports Park, the advertising agency Saxton Horne, and the Delta Center. The Fanzz chain of sports apparel stores was also owned by LHM Group until its sale to Ames Watson Capital in 2018.

== Family and early life ==
Miller was born as Lawrence Horne West to Mary Lorille Horne and Howard Hanley West. His parents divorced in 1946, and in June 1948, his mother married Frank Soren Miller. Larry was legally adopted by his stepfather in September 1949, and his surname was changed to Miller. He did not meet his biological father again until he was middle-aged.

Miller earned poor grades in school but was also a National Merit Scholar. Miller graduated from West High School in Salt Lake City. He spent six weeks attending college.

Miller was employed in construction by his uncle, Reid Horne, on and off until 1964, when he and all the workers were laid off due to a lack of business. That same year, he spent the summer working for Aaron’s Coverall and Towel Service as a truck driver. Later in 1964, he went to work for American Auto Parts. He started at $1.10 per hour and worked stocking shelves, making deliveries, and cleaning.

After leaving American Auto Parts, Miller found a job, via a newspaper ad, at a car dealership, Bountiful Motors, working in the parts department. He started at $300 for the first month with a promise of a raise to $350 for further months. After Bountiful Motors failed to keep its promise, Miller accepted a chance job offer from a customer. His new employer was Paint and Piston, a body shop, where he earned $425 per month. He worked there for a year, but then moved to Gresh and Jerry's Chevron gas station where he earned $450 doing mechanical work, pumping gas, and managing the parts inventory. In part due to the gas station's failure to honor its agreement with respect to working hours, Miller moved on to Peck and Shaw GMC-Toyota, a car dealer. The dealership wanted to establish separate parts departments for GMC and Toyota, with Miller choosing to lead the Toyota department.

Miller moved on to work for Main Motors, a dealer of snowmobiles, motorcycles, trucks, and trailers as manager of the parts department. He was initially paid $650 per month and promised additional pay equal to 10% of his department's profits. Even after turning the department around and coming across a financial statement proving that it was profitable, his employer refused to honor their agreement. The overall business was doing poorly and staff cuts were made, creating a great deal of stress. Miller quit immediately after a confrontation over these issues with the owner. Miller reconciled with Main Motors after taking, but not starting, a position at Burt Chevrolet-Toyota in Englewood, Colorado.

After more broken promises, Miller left Main Motors for good in 1970 and went to work with Burt as their Toyota parts manager. After further conflict over compensation and other issues Miller left after giving two-weeks notice. Mistreatment by his employers made Miller realize that treating workers well could be a key competitive advantage.

Miller had a much more positive experience at Chuck Stevinson Toyota in Lakewood, Colorado. In 1971, he was hired to turnaround their parts department. By his second year on the job, it had the highest parts sales of any Toyota dealership in the United States. Miller achieved this by building a national wholesale business instead of just focusing on the local market. Miller took advantage of the demand for locking gas caps during the energy crisis by buying the entire wholesale stock of such caps, which were only made by two companies. In 1973, Gene Osborne, part owner of the dealership, offered Miller a promotion to general manager. This promotion did not take effect until 1974 due to the oil embargo of the same year. In 1977, Miller was appointed the operations manager for all five of Stevinson's Toyota locations. Miller was eventually demoted to head one of the locations in order to make room for Stevinson's sons, with Miller asked to mentor them. Miller's work with Stevinson gave him national recognition among Toyota dealers and repair shops.

Softball and drag racing, two of his interests, helped launch Miller's careers in sports and automobiles. From 1963 to 1970, Miller raced cars, and from 1962 to 1985, he was a fast-pitch softball player, pitching in the Salt Lake City and Denver metro leagues.

Miller had a deep love for both baseball and softball. The family move from Utah to Colorado in 1970 was driven by his desire to play fast-pitch softball for Hagestad Volkswagen in Denver. Miller also collected memorabilia from Major League Baseball.

Miller married his high school girlfriend, Gail Saxton, on March 25, 1965, and they became the parents of five children: Gregory Scott, Roger Lawrence (August 21, 1968 – August 18, 2013), Stephen Frank, Karen Rebecca, and Bryan Joseph. He had 21 grandchildren.

== Religion ==
Miller was a lifelong member of the Church of Jesus Christ of Latter-day Saints (LDS Church). By the age of 22, he had stopped participating in church activities. Miller's wife and son, Greg, eventually began attending services. Miller delayed because he preferred playing softball and attending football games. In 1975, Miller re-engaged with the church by attending a Relief Society dinner in his local congregation with his friends, the LaPoint family, and was soon interested in seeking to be ordained an elder in the church's priesthood. While his involvement with the church increased over the next few years, Miller described his feelings at that time as "non-committal."

Several years later, after reflecting on his faith, Miller's commitment became firm and he was ordained an elder. In late 1978, Miller directed his wife to begin tithing based on their gross income.

Miller provided initial funding for a team of experts at Brigham Young University (BYU) that examined documents from the early history of the LDS Church. This team later compiled The Joseph Smith Papers. In addition to the books with Smith's papers, the project generated a companion television series. Miller funded this project with a donation of $10 million in bonds and additional cash contributions. The project published its 27th and final volume in 2023.

== Business ==
=== Car dealerships ===
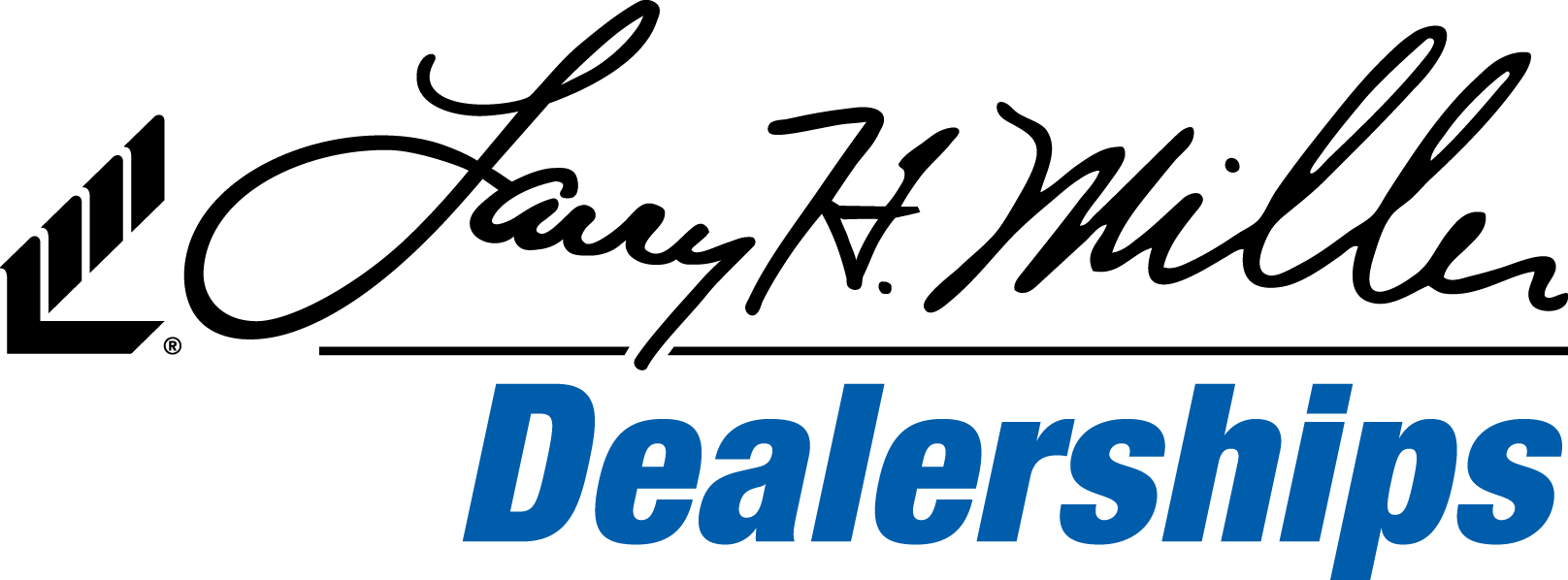
LHM

Miller worked with his uncle, Reid Horne, to acquire Toyota of Murray in the Salt Lake City suburbs from Hugh Gardner and his partner for $3.5 million. Miller had only $88,000 and difficulty securing bank financing. Horne obtained a loan of $200,000. Gardner and his partner agreed to accept three notes for the remaining balance, with a ten-year repayment term. Miller was deeply worried about the financial burden of the debt on his business. He recognized that the dealership was underperforming and believed he could improve its performance.

Gardner and his partner defrauded Miller by selling off inventory at-cost to their friends before transferring ownership. Miller and Horne had anticipated this and arranged for a shipment of new inventory from Toyota in advance and stored them off-site until closing. The dealership re-opened on May 1, 1979, as Larry H. Miller Toyota. They sold 172 cars their first month in business. The location had only averaged 30 cars per month previously.

Four months after acquiring his first location, Miller got a phone call from Erwin Ashenfelter about buying a distressed dealership in Spokane, Washington. Miller conducted difficult negotiations with banks in Washington to loan him the necessary money. He also had difficulty getting inventory for the new dealership as it had no dealer code and no flooring line. Miller offered to pay cash and had the cars ultimately bound for Spokane shipped to Murray. Miller quickly bought another distressed dealership in Moscow, Idaho. In late 1980, Miller purchased another location in Phoenix, Arizona.

The first years in business were difficult for Miller. He often teetered on the edge of failure. His uncle ran into financial difficulties that Miller considered a threat to the dealership. In October 1981, Miller bought out his uncle's share in the business. Miller paid for this by borrowing $700,000. The dealerships rebounded strongly in 1983 and 1984.

Throughout the 1980s and early 1990s, Miller acquired a number of automobile dealerships in Utah, Colorado, Arizona, and New Mexico, creating the Larry H. Miller Automotive Group. In 2007, Selling Power listed him as the tenth-largest U.S. automotive dealer, with 42 dealerships and sales of $13.5 million. Miller placed a strong emphasis on vertical integration to help his car business. For example, he started an advertising agency, a printing shop, and an insurance company. By the 1990s, Miller's reputation made financing new business ventures much easier.

The Larry H. Miller Automotive Group sold its dealerships to Asbury Automotive in 2021 for $3.2 billion.

In the 2000s, Miller led a successful effort to pass a law prohibiting car dealerships from doing business on consecutive weekend days. An effort to repeal this law failed in 2025.

=== Television ===
After a failed attempt to start a television station on the last remaining VHF frequency in the Utah market, Miller purchased Salt Lake City independent station KXIV in February 1993. He later changed the call letters to KJZZ-TV as a reference to the Utah Jazz.

From 1995 to 2001, KJZZ-TV was a charter UPN affiliate. In October 2000, Miller demanded the right to breach his contract with the network if it increased its "urban/ethnic programming" to more than two hours per week, due to lack of minorities within the Salt Lake Metropolitan.

=== Restaurant ===
In July 2000, Miller was sued by Casa Bonita, a Lakewood, Colorado restaurant, for violation of intellectual property rights and unfair competition. The suit alleged that Miller's restaurant, The Mayan, copied the trade dress of Casa Bonita. Allegedly, Miller had visited Casa Bonita several times beginning in 1996, and asked to see the books.

=== Other businesses ===
Miller also owned Megaplex Theatres, Prestige Financial Services, Miller Motorsports Park, Saxton Horne Communications, Fanzz (a chain of sports clothing & memorabilia outlets), and the Jordan Commons cinema/restaurant complexes along the Wasatch Front. As of 2021, there are 11 Megaplex Theaters located in shopping centers, including ten in Utah: The Gateway mall in downtown Salt Lake City, Jordan Commons in Sandy, The District in South Jordan, The Junction in Ogden, Thanksgiving Point in Lehi, Cedar City, Centerville, Logan, St. George, West Valley City, and Vineyard; as well as one in Mesquite, Nevada. Together the theaters total 191 screens.

The cancellation of showings of Brokeback Mountain brought international attention to the theaters. The Gay Lesbian Bisexual Transgender Community Center of Utah and other gay rights groups urged its members to avoid patronizing Miller's various businesses. John Amaechi, a retired center who finished his career with the Utah Jazz in 2003, publicly announced his homosexuality on February 7, 2007. Miller issued a statement the following day, conceding that he had made a bad decision in pulling Brokeback Mountain. He described it as a "knee-jerk reaction" and said that he would probably allow the film to be shown if faced with the same decision again; however he said he was still unsure how he would react to an openly gay player on his basketball team. Miller later explained the cancellation, saying that he was concerned about "getting away from the traditional families," what he called "a very dangerous thing." Miller noted that several individuals purchased automobiles from his dealerships as a form of support for the decision. He also expressed regret for any feelings that were hurt.

=== Sports ===
==== Utah Jazz ====
In early 1985, Miller received a letter that had been sent to a total of 40 business leaders to recapitalize the Utah Jazz and keep it in Utah. After being contacted by team management a few weeks later, Miller made an offer of $6.25 million, in response to the team's desire for $8 million, for a 50-percent interest. Miller's offer was rejected but he assisted with the attempts to sell the team. Miller eventually offered the full $8 million to counter an offer that would have moved the team to Miami, Florida. Miller had difficulty obtaining financing since the $8 million was two times his net worth and the team had never made a profit in its entire 11-year lifetime. The Jazz lost $17 million over 11 years and only lost $1 million during its best year. He was able to get a commitment from a consortium of six local banks with just seven minutes before the expiration of the deadline imposed by Jazz owner, Sam Battistone, on April 11, 1985. Battistone had difficulty getting the NBA to approve the purchase, primarily due to Miller's relatively low net worth. Miller became a co-owner of the Utah Jazz when his purchase of a 50% interest in the team was approved by the NBA on May 10, 1985.

Fourteen months later, Miller was about to sign a deal to sell his interest in the Jazz for $14 million but backed away at the last moment because it would result in the team moving to Minnesota. Miller realized that the Jazz operated in the smallest market in the NBA and doubted that Salt Lake City would ever have an NBA team again. Miller decided to turn the Texas option in his purchase contract and buy out Battisone.

On June 16, 1986, he purchased the remaining 50% from Battisone. To make the deal work, Miller offered to forgive a $3.5 million loan he had made to Battisone and assume payments on a loan that he was using that money to pay, assume another $1 million that Battistone and a partner had defaulted on, a $5.5 million note that would be payable to StratAmerica. In addition, $2 million in cash, the use of a Chrysler New Yorker demo car for Battisone's wife and a Chrysler Caprice demo car for each year Battistone until the StratAmerica note was paid, and ten Jazz tickets until the StatAmerica note was paid were offered. Battisone demanded a Corvette and ten additional tickets but otherwise liked the deal. Miller immediately agreed. Miller's payments on debt related to his purchase of the Jazz then amounted to $333,000 per month.

Miller made an effort to hire players of good moral character for the Jazz. Under his ownership, even the dress of players was tightly regulated. For example, players were required to wear shoes of the same color, all socks had to extend four inches up the ankle, shirts had to be tucked in, shoes had to properly tied at all times.

Miller was an enthusiastic owner. He had his own locker and wore a uniform to each game. He publicly greeted players on the court. He attended almost every game except for those held on Sundays, in order to observe the sabbath. Under Miller's ownership, the Jazz was the second-winningest team in the league.

Miller had a close relationship with John Stockton. Miller claimed that Stockton considered him a father figure.

Miller had a close but volatile relationship with Karl Malone. Malone would often express extreme affection for Miller and then publicly claim he was being mistreated by Miller and the team. Malone initiated numerous disputes over contracts. The two reconciled in 2007.

Miller built the Delta Center in downtown Salt Lake City to house the Jazz. Jon Huntsman Sr. advised Miller against building the arena. The Jazz previously played in the Salt Palace.

In October 2020, the Miller family agreed to sell the Jazz and Vivint Arena to Ryan Smith, founder of Qualtrics, for $1.66 billion. This price is about 70 times what the Miller family originally paid. Smith had a long-standing interest in the team. He even sponsored a jersey patch that raised $25 million for charity. Smith made proposals to the Miller family on several occasions before finally reaching acceptable terms. Terms of the deal require the team to remain in Utah and the Miller family will retain a minority interest. The Salt Lake City Stars of the NBA G League and management of the Salt Lake Bees minor league baseball team were also part of the deal. The Miller family said they planned to use the profits from this sale to diversify their businesses and engage in more extensive philanthropy. The Millers rejected previous offers to buy the Jazz.

==== Salt Lake Bees ====
Miller was an unpaid consultant in the project to construct Smith's Ballpark (formerly Spring Mobile Ballpark), now the home of the Los Angeles Angels' Triple-A affiliate Salt Lake Bees. He purchased the team in 2003 and changed the name from the Salt Lake Stingers to the Bees. The team is now owned by Miller Sports + Entertainment.

==== Salt Lake Golden Eagles ====
Miller owned the Salt Lake Golden Eagles ice hockey team, which he purchased in September 1989.

==== Utah Starzz ====
Miller owned the Utah Starzz WNBA team (Starzz referencing a former successful ABA team, the Utah Stars and the double-z in Jazz). Miller sold the team in 2002 to San Antonio Spurs owner Peter Holt who moved the team to San Antonio and renamed them twice, first as the San Antonio Silver Stars and then as the San Antonio Stars. In 2017, the team was bought by MGM Resorts International and moved to Las Vegas as the Las Vegas Aces.

==== Motor sports ====
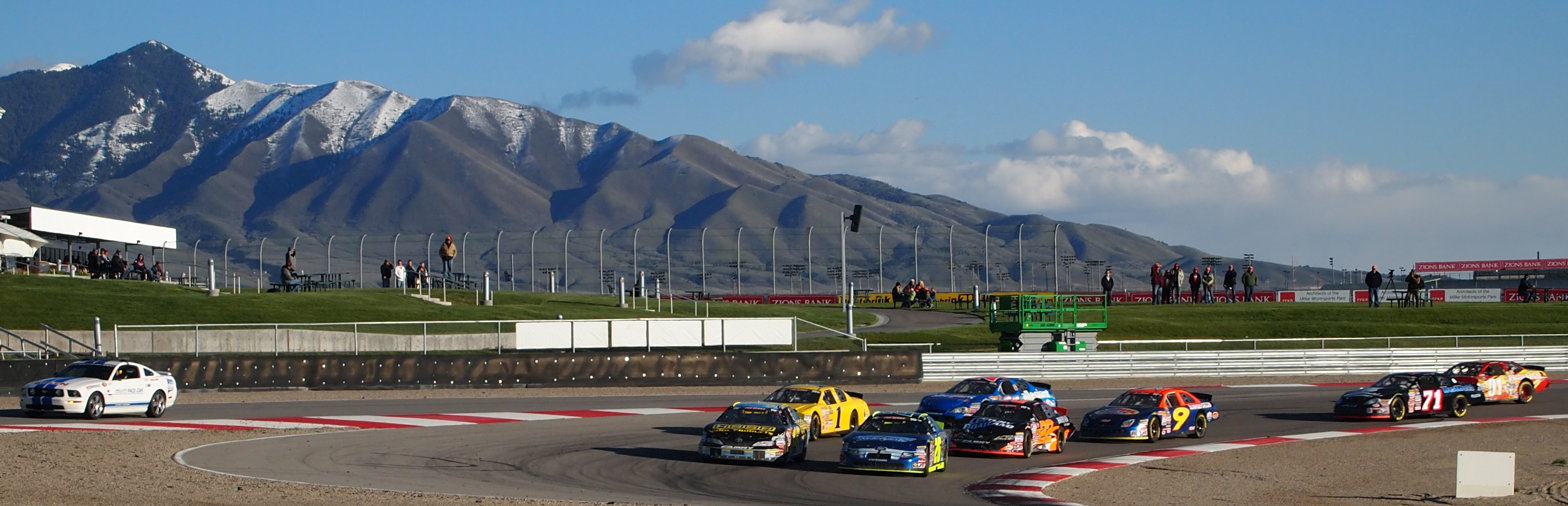
2011 Larry H. Miller Dealerships Utah Grand Prix restart

The Millers owned the former Miller Motorsports Park, a road racing course that has held domestic and international car and motorcycle racing events.

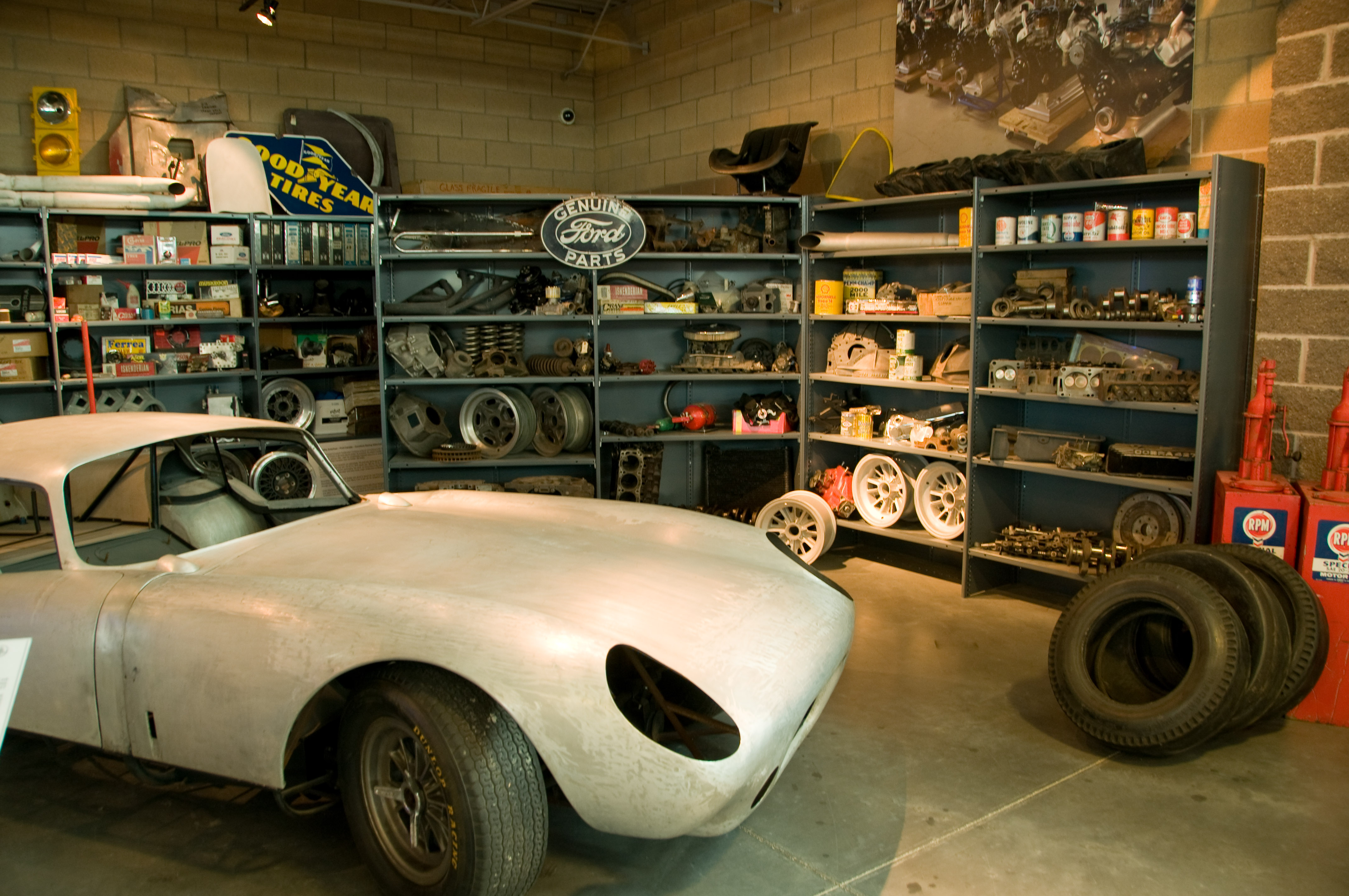
The Larry H. Miller Total Performance Auto Museum (5177527913)

==== Tour of Utah ====
The Larry H. Miller Tour of Utah is an annual professional road bicycle racing stage race.

==== Fanzz ====
Fanzz is a sports apparel and team gear retailer based in Salt Lake City, Utah. Fanzz began operations in 1985. As of 2018, Fanzz/Just Sports had approximately 85 retail store locations in several states. Fanzz purchased the Northwest-based Just Sports retailer on October 1, 2013. The company's assets were sold in 2018 by the Larry H. Miller Company to Ames Watson Capital and re-incorporated as Fanzz Gear.

== Philanthropy ==
Miller contributed to a variety of causes and organizations including many projects related to the LDS Church, academic scholarships, American history, preserving historic architecture, planetariums, hospitals, music, art, horticulture, and numerous other forms of public service and philanthropy.

Miller started a "Teach the Teacher" project to fund rigorous summer tours devoted to American history in 2007. The program selects three groups of 30 teachers each and sends them to one focused on Utah with an emphasis on Native American history, another on westward migration, and yet another on colonial America. All expenses and a per diem are covered.

The sports complex of the BYU Cougars is named after Miller, who was a major donor to the project.

He made a $21 million donation for a law-enforcement training center.

The Larry H. and Gail Miller Salt Lake Community College campus was built with $50 million in donations from Miller.

Miller endowed a chair in the English department at the University of Utah.

Miller's donations allowed for the construction of the baseball and softball complex at BYU.

== Awards ==
His public service was recognized by numerous awards, including the Utah Minuteman Award from the Utah National Guard in 1990, an honorary Doctor of Laws degree from the University of Utah in 1991, and the Tourist Achievement Award from the Salt Lake Convention and Visitors Bureau in 1992.

Miller received a total of five honorary doctorates.

== Car collection ==
Miller had a collection of 15 Ford Shelby Cobras. Only 1,011 were ever made. Miller paid $4 million for the most expensive of these. Miller regretted having to put two of his cars up for collateral to secure loans to buy the Utah Jazz. Miller also collected GT-40s and Shelby Mustangs.

== Later years and death ==
In June 2008, Miller suffered a severe heart attack, and was hospitalized for 59 days with complications that included kidney failure and gastrointestinal bleeding, which required a blood transfusion. In October 2008, he developed a bone infection and diabetic ulcers on one foot that required outpatient surgery. On January 23, 2009, Miller underwent surgery to amputate both legs six inches below the knee, a result of complications from type-2 diabetes.

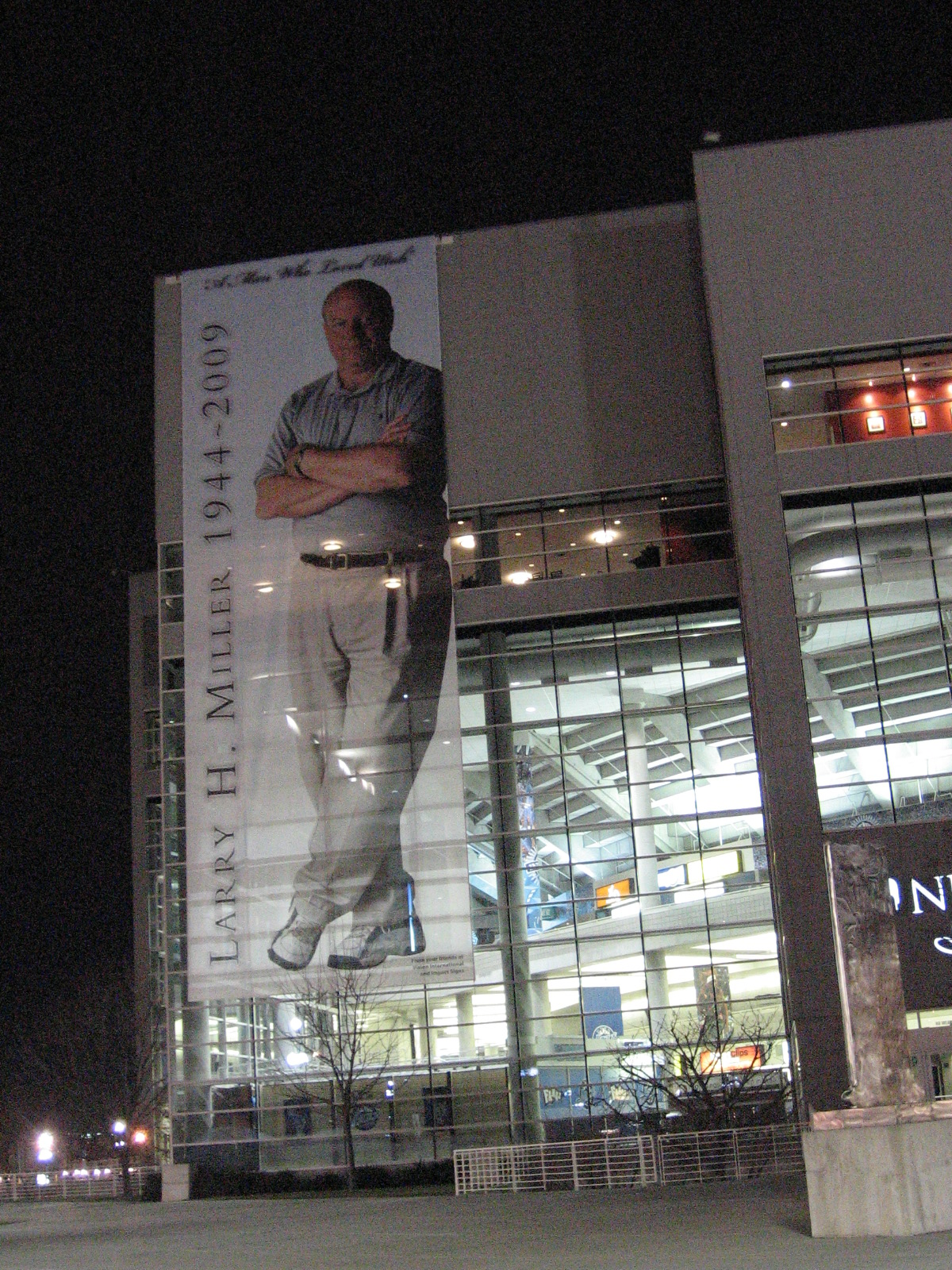
Larry Miller tribute

Once he realized his death was imminent, Miller stopped dialysis and returned home. On February 20, 2009, surrounded by family at his home, Miller died of complications from type-2 diabetes.

NBA Commissioner David Stern issued a statement on the passing of Miller: "It is with great sadness that I offer condolences to Gail and the Miller family on behalf of the entire NBA family. Larry's legacy extends beyond the NBA as he touched many lives in the Salt Lake City region through his business ventures and charitable endeavors. The NBA lost a great leader, colleague and friend today. We will miss him."

Miller's funeral was held in the Vivint Arena.

== Places, buildings, and events named after Miller ==
- Larry H Miller Campus of Salt Lake Community College
- Larry H. Miller Sports Complex
- Larry & Gail Miller Public Safety Education and Training Center — Salt Lake Community College Miller Campus
- Miller Automotive Training Center — Salt Lake Community College Miller Campus
- Miller Corporate Partnership Center — Salt Lake Community College Miller Campus
- Miller Free Enterprise Center — Salt Lake Community College Miller Campus
- Miller Professional Development Center — Salt Lake Community College Miller Campus
- Miller Motorsports Park
- Larry H. Miller Tour of Utah — bicycle race
- Larry H. Miller Softball Complex
- Larry H. Miller Court at Delta Center
- Miller Cafe, Lassonde Studios, University of Utah
- Larry H. Miller Dealerships, Murray, Utah.
- Intermountain Health Primary Children’s Hospital Larry H. and Gail Miller Family Campus - Lehi, UT

Sporting positions
Preceded by Sam Battistone	Utah Jazz principal owner 1985–2009	Succeeded by Gail Miller
New title	Utah Starzz principal owner 1997–2002	Succeeded by Peter Holt as San Antonio Silver Stars
