= Salt Lake Bees =

- Founded in 1994; South Jordan, Utah
Team logo
Cap insignia

Minor league affiliations
- Class: Triple-A (1994–present)
- League: Pacific Coast League (1994–present)
- Division: West Division

Major league affiliations
- Team: Los Angeles Angels (2001–present)
- Previous teams: Minnesota Twins (1994–2000)

Minor league titles
- League titles (0): None
- Conference titles (3): 2000; 2002; 2013
- Division titles (8): 1995; 1999; 2000; 2002; 2006; 2007; 2008; 2013
- Second-half titles (1): 1995
- Wild card berths (2): 1994; 1996

Team data
- Name: Salt Lake Bees (2006–present)
- Previous names: Salt Lake Stingers (2001–2005); Salt Lake Buzz (1994–2000)
- Colors: Black, gold, white
- Mascot: Bumble
- Ballpark: The Ballpark at America First Square (2025–present)
- Previous parks: Smith's Ballpark (1994–2024)
- Owner/ Operator: Miller Sports + Entertainment
- General manager: Corina Nelson
- Manager: Doug Davis
- Website: milb.com/salt-lake

The Salt Lake Bees are a Minor League Baseball (MiLB) team that plays in the Pacific Coast League (PCL). They are the Triple-A affiliate of the Los Angeles Angels.

Based in South Jordan, Utah, the team has played its home games at The Ballpark at America First Square since 2025. The team previously played its home games at Smith's Ballpark in Salt Lake City from its opening in 1994 until the end of the 2024 season.

Formerly known as the Salt Lake Buzz from 1994 to 2000 and the Salt Lake Stingers from 2001 to 2005, the team adopted the Bees moniker in 2006. Since their inception in 1994, they have been a part of the PCL, including the 2021 season when the league was called Triple-A West.

== History ==
=== Prior teams ===
After the 1914 Pacific Coast League season, Salt Lake City businessman Bill "Hardpan" Lane purchased the Sacramento Solons and brought the team to Utah as the Salt Lake City Bees. Though a charter member of the PCL, the Solons suffered on the field and at the gate, being exiled at times to Tacoma, Fresno, and San Francisco. On March 31, 1915, their first game was played with more than 10,000 fans pouring into Majestic Park (later renamed Bonneville Park) to cheer the Bees to a 9–3 win over the Vernon Tigers.

The original Bees never won a PCL pennant, but they drew attendees well, especially given the small market size. However, other PCL team owners resented the high cost of travel to Salt Lake City. When the Vernon Tigers abandoned Los Angeles after the 1925 season, it was suggested to Lane that he would do well to transfer his team to Southern California. After 11 seasons, the Bees moved to Los Angeles for the 1926 season. Initially known as the Hollywood Bees, the team soon became the Hollywood Stars. After ten seasons in Hollywood, the team transferred again to San Diego, where it played as the San Diego Padres from 1936 to 1968. Salt Lake City was without a baseball team until 1946, when it received a franchise in the Pioneer League.

Salt Lake City once was home to an all-black baseball team called the Occidentals. They played during the early 1900s against white teams in Utah and across the Western United States.

In 1971, the Salt Lake City Angels started playing. The minor league team was affiliated with the California Angels.

=== Salt Lake Buzz (1994–2000) ===
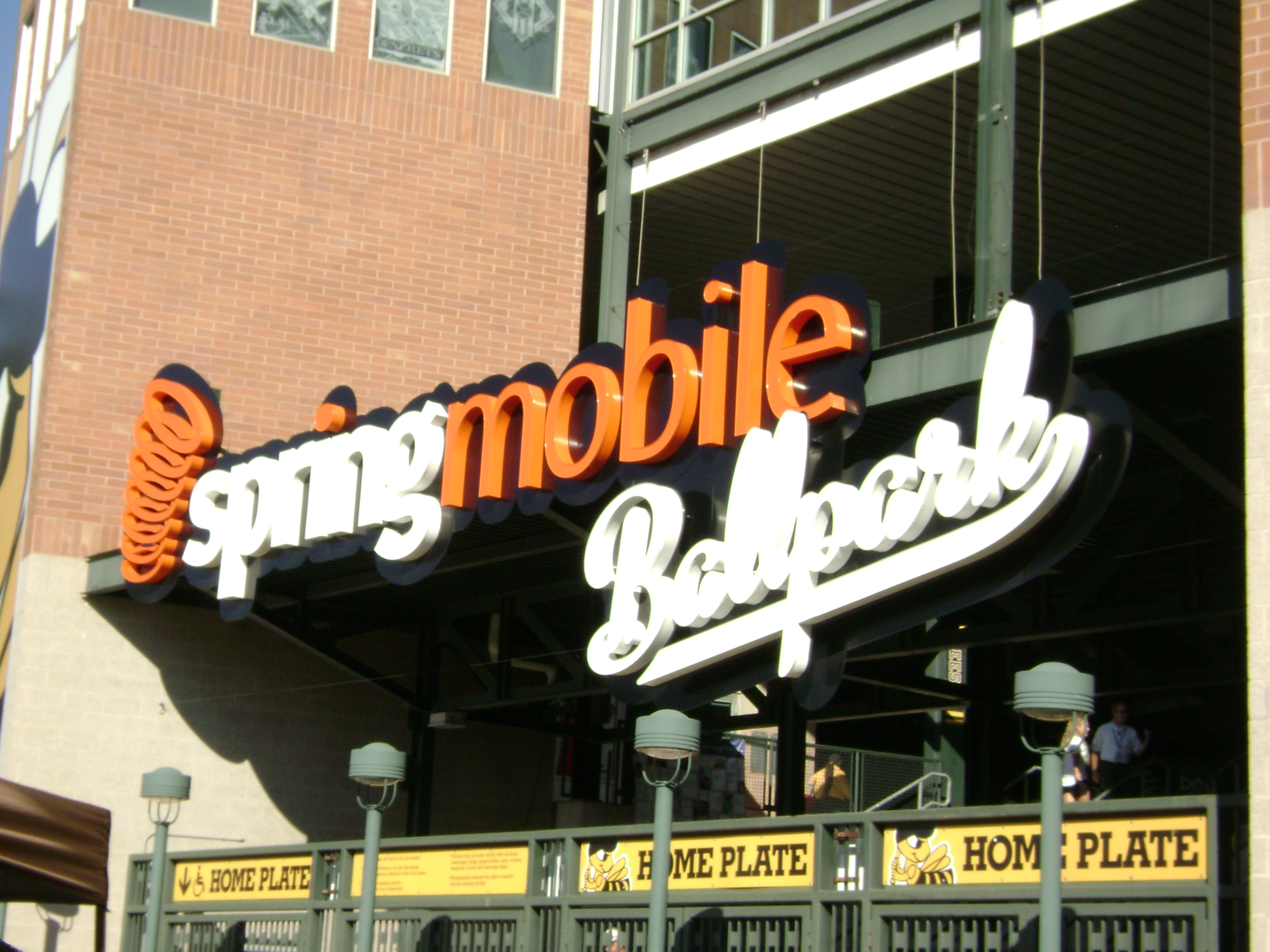
An entrance gate to Smith's Ballpark (former stadium name Spring Mobile Ballpark pictured), home of the Bees

The current franchise dates from 1994, when Joe Buzas, a former major league player and the owner of the PCL Portland Beavers, moved the team to Salt Lake City. Buzas made a deal wherein the city would build a new ballpark on the site of historic Derks Field in exchange for relocating the team. The new ballpark, Franklin Quest Field, opened in 1994 with the renamed Salt Lake Buzz drawing 713,224 fans to home games during their inaugural season—breaking the PCL single-season attendance record that had stood for 48 years.

=== Salt Lake Stingers (2001-2005) ===
Known as the Salt Lake Buzz from 1994 to 2000, the team changed its name to the Salt Lake Stingers in 2001. The change was forced by a trademark dilution lawsuit filed by Georgia Tech, whose yellowjacket mascot is named Buzz.

Stingers owner Joe Buzas died in 2003. Larry H. Miller purchased the Stingers in 2005 from his estate.

=== Salt Lake Bees (2006-present) ===
Following the 2005 season, the team announced the Stingers would henceforth be known as the Salt Lake Bees, the name of the original PCL franchise which played in Salt Lake City from 1915 to 1926 and from 1958 to 1965. The team also chose a logo, jersey, and color scheme similar to the latter Bees PCL franchise. Bees have long been a symbol of Utah. The original name of the Mormon settlement, Deseret, is said to be the word for "honeybee" in the Book of Mormon; a beehive appears on the Utah state flag; the state motto is "Industry" (for which bees are known); and Utah is widely known as the "Beehive State."

In 2019, the Bees announced a new logo, name, and branding for the team, taking on the name "Abejas de Salt Lake" for their ongoing participation in The Copa de la Diversión.

In conjunction with Major League Baseball's restructuring of Minor League Baseball in 2021, the Bees were organized into the Triple-A West. Salt Lake ended the season in fifth place in the Western Division with a 49–70 record. No playoffs were held to determine a league champion; instead, the team with the best regular-season record was declared the winner. However, 10 games that had been postponed from the start of the season were reinserted into the schedule as a postseason tournament called the Triple-A Final Stretch in which all 30 Triple-A clubs competed for the highest winning percentage. Salt Lake finished the tournament tied for seventh place with a 6–4 record. In 2022, the Triple-A West became known as the Pacific Coast League, the name historically used by the regional circuit prior to the 2021 reorganization.

In the early part of the 2023 season, Jo Adell broke a franchise record with a six-game straight home run streak.

In early 2024, Marc Amicone left the Bees to become an advisor on baseball matters for the Larry H. Miller Company. He will work with the company and Big League Utah in their efforts to bring a Major League Baseball team to Utah. The team named Ty Wardle, the Bees' former chief revenue officer, as the new general manager. Cameron Coughlan was hired as assistant general manager.

During the 2024 season, three-time Major League Baseball MVP Mike Trout played with the Bees as part of his physical rehabilitation. Trout had previously played for the Bees in 2012.

As of the 2024 season, the Bees have played under multiple names including the Buzz, Gulls, Occidentals, Trappers and Stingers. They played under the name Malmö Oat Milkers due to a licensing deal that Minor League Baseball struck with the Swedish firm Oatly. Oatly operates a plant in Ogden, Utah.

The Bees played their final game at Smith's Ballpark on September 22, 2024. They moved to The Ballpark at America First Square.

The Bees introduced new uniforms and logos in late 2024.

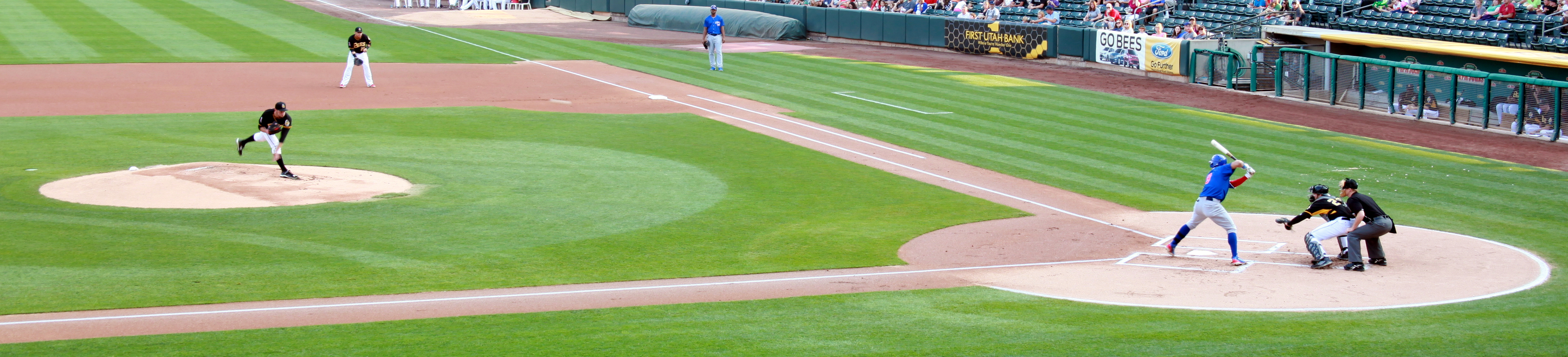
A Salt Lake Bees game in 2015

== Management ==
=== Corina Nelson ===
In 2026, Corina Nelson, a senior executive at the Larry H. Miller company, was named general manager. She is the first woman to hold this position.

=== Doug Davis ===
Doug Davis was named manager of the Bees in early 2026. Davis played in the minor leagues for 11 years. He also played seven games in Major League Baseball and was one of Angels' ninth-round draft picks in 1984. Davis was a bench coach for the Florida Marlins during their 2003 World Series victory. He is the ninth manager in the club's history.

=== Keith Johnson ===
Keith Johnson first became manager of the Bees in 2011, spending four seasons in Salt Lake. In 2015, Johnson left the Bees to become a minor league scout for the Angels. Johnson rejoined the Bees' management team in 2016. Over the course of three seasons, he achieved an additional 195 victories. However, his streak was briefly interrupted in 2018 when he received a promotion to an assistant's position within the Angels' office in Los Angeles. At the time of his departure, Johnson had amassed a total of 468 wins. Subsequently, he transitioned to the Miami Marlins organization after the 2018 season, where he spent four years alternating between the minor league and major league coaching. In 2023, Johnson made a return to the Bees.

On April 6, 2023, Johnson won his 472nd game as manager of the Bees, breaking the record for the most victories by a manager in the history of the current Salt Lake franchise. The previous record was set by former Buzz manager Phil Roof, who managed the team from 1995 to 2000. On June 16, 2023, Johnson won his 500th game as Bees skipper. Johnson had a previous career as a minor league baseball player, spending the 2002 and 2003 seasons with the Stingers.

Johnson left the Bees at the end of the 2025 season to take a position with the Los Angeles Angels as their third-base coach for 2026.

== Venue ==
The Bees play at The Ballpark at America First Square.

The Bees formerly played at Smith's Ballpark. It was once known as Franklin Covey Field. It was renamed in 2014.

== Mascot ==
The team mascot is a large bee named Bumble. In 2026, the Bees introduced four other mascots: Honey, Daysie, Jensen, and Swiggy. Honey is another bee and the best friend of Bumble. Daysie, named after Downtown Daybreak, is a golden doodle dog. Jensen is a dinosaur named after paleontologist Jim Jensen, who discovered the Utahraptor. Swiggy is a dirty soda.

== Media ==
All Salt Lake Bees games are streamed on MiLB.TV. In Salt Lake, Bees games are broadcast locally on radio station KZNS. As of 2026, Tuesday, Wednesday, and Thursday home games are locally telecasted by KMYU. Additionally, one home series a season is designated as "Bees Week," in which all six games (Tuesday through Sunday) can be seen on KMYU.

Tony Parks is the voice of the Bees, inheriting that position in 2024 following the retirement of longtime voice Steve Klauke, who died suddenly in June 2024 after being struck by an automobile. The driver was later convicted of negligent homicide.

== Season-by-season records ==
Key
League	The team's final position in the league standings
Division	The team's final position in the divisional standings
GB	Games behind the team that finished in first place in the division that season
‡	Class champions (1998–present)
†	League champions (1994–present)
§	Conference champions (1998–2020)
*	Division champions (1994–2022)
^	Postseason berth (1994–present)

Season-by-season records
Season	League	Regular-season					Postseason			MLB affiliate	Ref.
Season	League	Record	Win %	League	Division	GB	Record	Win %	Result	MLB affiliate	Ref.
1994^	PCL	74–70	.514	4th (tie)	2nd	4	2–3	.400	Lost Northern Division title vs. Vancouver Canadians, 3–2	Minnesota Twins	
1995^ *	PCL	79–65	.549	3rd	2nd	3 1/2	5–4	.556	Won Second Half Northern Division title Won Northern Division title vs. Vancouver Canadians, 3–1; Lost PCL championship vs. Colorado Springs Sky Sox, 3–2	Minnesota Twins	
1996^	PCL	78–66	.542	2nd	2nd	7	1–3	.250	Lost Northern Division title vs. Edmonton Trappers, 3–1	Minnesota Twins	
1997	PCL	72–71	.503	6th	4th	7 1/2	—	—	—	Minnesota Twins	
1998	PCL	79–64	.552	4th (tie)	2nd	2	—	—	—	Minnesota Twins	
1999 *	PCL	73–68	.518	6th	1st	—	2–3	.400	Won Pacific Conference Southern Division title Lost Pacific Conference title vs. Vancouver Canadians, 3–2	Minnesota Twins	
2000 * §	PCL	90–53	.629	1st	1st	—	4–5	.444	Won Pacific Conference Northern Division title Won Pacific Conference title vs. Sacramento River Cats, 3–2; Lost PCL championship vs. Memphis Redbirds, 3–1	Minnesota Twins	
2001	PCL	79–64	.552	4th	2nd	4	—	—	—	Anaheim Angels	
2002 * §	PCL	78–66	.542	3rd	1st	—	4–3	.571	Won American Conference Central Division title Won American Conference title vs. Oklahoma RedHawks, 3–0; Lost PCL championship vs. Edmonton Trappers, 3–1	Anaheim Angels	
2003	PCL	68–75	.476	13th	3rd	5 1/2	—	—	—	Anaheim Angels	
2004	PCL	56–88	.389	16th	4th	28	—	—	—	Anaheim Angels	
2005	PCL	79–65	.549	4th	2nd	1	—	—	—	Los Angeles Angels of Anaheim	
2006 *	PCL	81–63	.563	3rd	1st	—	1–3	.250	Won Pacific Conference Northern Division title Lost Pacific Conference title vs. Tucson Sidewinders, 3–1	Los Angeles Angels of Anaheim	
2007 *	PCL	74–69	.517	7th	1st	—	2–3	.400	Won Pacific Conference Northern Division title Lost Pacific Conference title vs. Sacramento River Cats, 3–2	Los Angeles Angels of Anaheim	
2008 *	PCL	84–60	.583	2nd	1st	—	1–3	.250	Won Pacific Conference Northern Division title Lost Pacific Conference title vs. Sacramento River Cats, 3–1	Los Angeles Angels of Anaheim	
2009	PCL	72–71	.503	8th	3rd	1 1/2	—	—	—	Los Angeles Angels of Anaheim	
2010	PCL	73–71	.507	8th	2nd	1 1/2	—	—	—	Los Angeles Angels of Anaheim	
2011	PCL	62–82	.431	16th	4th	15	—	—	—	Los Angeles Angels of Anaheim	
2012	PCL	73–71	.507	10th	3rd	8	—	—	—	Los Angeles Angels of Anaheim	
2013 * §	PCL	78–66	.542	4th	1st	—	4–4	.500	Won Pacific Conference Northern Division title Won Pacific Conference title vs. Las Vegas 51s, 3–1; Lost PCL championship vs. Omaha Storm Chasers, 3–1	Los Angeles Angels of Anaheim	
2014	PCL	60–84	.417	15th	4th	21	—	—	—	Los Angeles Angels of Anaheim	
2015	PCL	58–86	.403	15th (tie)	4th	20	—	—	—	Los Angeles Angels of Anaheim	
2016	PCL	63–79	.444	15th	4th	9 1/2	—	—	—	Los Angeles Angels	
2017	PCL	72–70	.507	7th	2nd	1	—	—	—	Los Angeles Angels	
2018	PCL	71–68	.511	8th	2nd	11	—	—	—	Los Angeles Angels	
2019	PCL	60–79	.432	11th	3rd	22 1/2	—	—	—	Los Angeles Angels	
2020	PCL	Season cancelled (COVID-19 pandemic)								Los Angeles Angels	
2021	AAAW	55–74 (Note: In 2021, the team with the best record at the end of the regular-season was declared the Triple-A West champion. Salt Lake had a 49–70 (.412) record, 20 1/2 games behind first place, which put them 9th in the league and 5th in their division. The regular-season was followed by the Triple-A Final Stretch, a 10-game postseason tournament in which all 30 Triple-A clubs competed for the highest winning percentage. Salt Lake finished the tournament tied for 7th place with a 6–4 (.600) record.)	.426	9th	5th	22 1/2	—	—	—	Los Angeles Angels	
2022	PCL	70–80	.467	8th	4th	16	—	—	—	Los Angeles Angels	
2023	PCL	70–79	.470	6th	4th	17 1/2	—	—	—	Los Angeles Angels	
2024	PCL	67–82	.450	8th	5th	14 1/2	—	—	—	Los Angeles Angels	
2025	PCL	65–84	.436	8th	4th	20 1/2	—	—	—	Los Angeles Angels	
2026	PCL	67–81	.453	8th	4th	20	—	—	—	Los Angeles Angels	
Totals	—	2,280–2,314	.496	—	—	—	26–34	.433	—	—	—

== Roster ==
Salt Lake Bees roster
Players	Coaches/Other
Pitchers: 37 Shaun Anderson *; 7 Sam Bachman *; 52 Brady Choban; 25 Ryan Costeiu; 49 Mason Erla; 53 Alex Faedo; 12 Leonard Garcia; 18 Joel Hurtado; 14 Rob Kaminsky *; 50 Kaleb Ort; 33 Jared Southard; 21 Dillon Tate; 1 Najer Victor; Catchers: 1 Gustavo Campero *; 16 Zach Humphreys; 28 Omar Martinez; Infielders: 8 Jeimer Candelario; 41 Ben Gobbel; 24 Niko Kavadas; 5 Yolmer Sánchez; 26 Nolan Schanuel *; 17 Arol Vera; Outfielders: 9 Cade Marlowe; 3 Nelson Rada; 4 Pablo Reyes *; 44 Raudi Rodriguez	Manager: 23 Doug Davis; Coaches: 40 Andy Hawkins (assistant pitching); 11 Shane Loux (pitching); 30 Alonzo Powell (hitting); 27 Jack Santora; 60-day injured list: -- Hayden Seig; 7-day injured list; * On Los Angeles Angels 40-man roster; ~ Development list; # Rehab assignment; ∞ Reserve list; ‡ Restricted list; § Suspended list; † Temporarily inactive list; Roster updated September 28, 2026; Transactions; → More rosters: MiLB • Pacific Coast League; → Los Angeles Angels minor league players

== Notable past players ==
Baseball Hall of Fame alumni

- David Ortiz (1997–99) Inducted 2022
- Paul Molitor (1998) Inducted 2004

Notable alumni

- Bernardo Brito (1994–95)
- LaTroy Hawkins (1994–97, 2012)
- Todd Walker (1996–97, 2000)
- A.J. Pierzynski (1998–2000) 2× All-Star, 1x Silver Slugger Award
- Torii Hunter (1998, 2000) 5× All-Star, 9× Gold Glove Award, 2× Silver Slugger Award
- John Lackey (2001–02, 2009) 1x All-Star
- Francisco Rodriguez (2002) 6× All-Star, 2× AL Rolaids Relief Man Award, 3× AL saves leader
- Chone Figgins (2003–04, 2007–08)
- Ervin Santana (2005, 2007, 2009)
- Joe Saunders (2005–07)
- Jered Weaver (2006)
- Erick Aybar (2006–07)
- Bartolo Colon (2006–07)
- Kendrys Morales (2006–08)
- Howie Kendrick (2006–09)
- Nick Adenhart (2008)
- Mark Trumbo (2010)
- Mike Trout (2012)
- David Freese (2014–15)
- Tim Lincecum (2016)
- Jared Walsh (2018–19, 2023)
