= Joe Buzas =

American baseball player, manager, and executive (1918-2003)

- Shortstop
- Born: October 2, 1918; Alpha, New Jersey
- Died: March 19, 2003 (aged 84); Salt Lake City, Utah
- Batted: Right Threw: Right

MLB debut
- April 17, 1945, for the New York Yankees

Last MLB appearance
- June 28, 1945, for the New York Yankees

MLB statistics
- Batting average: .262
- Home runs: 0
- Runs batted in: 6
- Stats at Baseball Reference

Teams
- New York Yankees (1945)

Joseph John Buzas (October 2, 1918 – March 19, 2003) was an American professional baseball player, manager, executive and entrepreneur. He appeared in 30 games in Major League Baseball as a shortstop and pinch hitter for the New York Yankees in 1945 during his ten-year active career before becoming an owner of minor league baseball franchises in 1958. Buzas would own and operate 82 minor-league clubs over the next 45 years, and was the owner and president of the Salt Lake Stingers at the time of his death. In 1975, he was presented with the King of Baseball award given by Minor League Baseball.

Buzas was born in Alpha, New Jersey and attended Phillipsburg High School. As a student at Bucknell University he was a standout in basketball, football, baseball and boxing. He began his pro baseball career with the Yankees' organization in 1941.

Buzas batted and threw right-handed and was listed as 6 feet 1 inch (1.85 m) tall and 180 pounds (82 kg). He made it to the major leagues in 1945, the final year of the World War II manpower shortage; during his 30-game trial, he had 17 hits, with two doubles, one triple, six runs batted in, two stolen bases, and a .262 batting average. A shoulder injury shortened his playing career, and Buzas briefly became a player-manager in the Cincinnati Reds' organization before going into private business in 1951.

In 1958, at age 39, he began his ownership career by taking over the moribund Syracuse franchise in the Class A Eastern League. Moving it to Allentown, Pennsylvania, he signed a working agreement with the Boston Red Sox and began a long association that would see Buzas operate Bosox farm clubs at the Class A, Double-A and Triple-A levels over the next 35 years. Notably, he founded the Pawtucket Red Sox in 1970 by moving his Pittsfield Red Sox to Rhode Island, and was the PawSox' first chief executive when they became a Triple-A franchise in 1973.

He also owned and operated affiliates of other major-league teams beginning in 1967. He moved west in 1986 when he acquired the Portland Beavers of the Triple-A Pacific Coast League. After relocating the Beavers to Salt Lake City in 1994, his Salt Lake Buzz led the PCL in attendance for their first six years. In 1996, his team received the John H. Johnson President's Award, given each year to the top minor league franchise.
