= Fanzz =

American sports apparel retailer

- Company type: Private (1985–2018)
- Industry: Retail
- Founded: 1985
- Founder: Larry H. Miller
- Defunct: February 2019; 7 years ago
- Fate: Became a part of Lids
- Headquarters: Salt Lake City, Utah, United States
- Number of locations: 100 (2017)
- Area served: United States
- Key people: Lawrence Berger President
- Products: Licensed sports equipment and apparel
- Owner: Madison & Ames
- Number of employees: 1000
- Parent: Ames Watson, LLC (2018–19)

Fanzz was an American sports apparel and team gear retailer that was based in Salt Lake City, Utah. Fanzz began operations in 1985. Fanzz/Just Sports had approximately 85 retail store locations in many US states. Fanzz purchased the Northwest-based Just Sports retailer on October 1, 2013.

Fanzz had licensing agreements with the main professional sports leagues in the U.S. such as NFL, NBA, MLB, MiLB, MLS, plus collegiate NCAA, to produce and market sports equipment and apparel.

The company's assets were sold in 2018 by the Larry H. Miller Company to Ames Watson Capital and re-incorporated as Fanzz Gear Inc. In February 2019, Fanzz joined Lids, causing all Fanzz stores including the website to join Lids. The website changed in 2024.
