= Big League Utah =

Group to pursue an MLB team for Utah

- Founded: April 12, 2023; 3 years ago
- Founder: Larry H. Miller Company
- Type: advocacy group
- Location: Salt Lake City, Utah
- Leader: Steve Starks
- Website: https://bigleagueutah.com

Big League Utah is a group pursuing a Major League Baseball (MLB) expansion team for Salt Lake City, Utah. It was formed in April 2023. It includes representatives from business, government, and sports. The group was formed amid talk of MLB's expansion. The development proposed by the group to host a future team has received local regulatory approval and funding from the state.

== History ==
Big League Utah was established in April of 2023 by business leaders, elected officials, and sports figures with the goal of securing a Major League Baseball team. Big League Utah was formally created by the Larry H. Miller Company (LHMCO), which would own the expansion team.

Utah's proposal focuses on Salt Lake City's Power District as the host location. Big League Utah has cited population growth, economic factors, and existing sports infrastructure as reasons to select Salt Lake City. Big League Utah is in competition with groups in cities such as Portland, Austin, Nashville, and Montreal.

Related construction, though not including the proposed stadium, started in Salt Lake City's Power District in April of 2023. This area has views of the city's skyline and the Wasatch Mountains. The site sits near an existing TRAX light-rail line and has easy access to freeways and the Salt Lake City International Airport. Big League Utah engaged Mortenson Construction, an experienced stadium developer, for work on the site.

Big League Utah argued for the Oakland Athletics to play for three seasons in Salt Lake City while waiting for the team's new stadium to be completed in Las Vegas. This effort was not successful.

Major League Baseball last expanded in 1998 when the Arizona Diamondbacks and Tampa Bay Rays were added. Commissioner Rob Manfred has said he is interested in expanding to 32 teams, though no formal decisions have been made as of September 2025. Major League Baseball is expected to announce plans for expansion in 2028.

As of February 2026, the Larry H. Miller Company was working with architects to determine the exact location, orientation, and seating capacity of the proposed stadium.

In early 2026, the Larry H. Miller Company announced plans to improve a section of the Jordan River that runs through the Power District. The plan calls for reintroducing native vegetation and aquatic animals, improving water quality, and adding a riverwalk. Field Operations, a landscape architecture firm, was hired for the project. The firm has worked on similar projects such as New York City's High Line, Seattle's Waterfront, and San Francisco's Presidio Tunnel Tops.

== Enabling legislation ==
Local and state regulatory approval has already been obtained for building a baseball stadium in Salt Lake City's Power District. The Power District is close to the Utah State Fairpark.

Development of the Power District has been facilitated by H.B. 562 The Larry H. Miller Company plans to invest $3.5 billion on development of this area that will include entertainment, other recreation, and business uses.

H.B. 562 created the Utah Fairpark Area Investment and Restoration District. The bill provided for $900 million to build a stadium. The team owner will lease the stadium from the state for $150,000 per month and provide roughly another $900 million for construction. The legislation also requires that sales tax revenue generated by the project be used for its financing. A car rental tax with an exemption for Utah residents will be implemented if Utah can attract a team. The district has the authority to impose use taxes on telecommunications and energy within its boundaries. H.B. 562 also provided funding for emergency services in rural counties.

The boundaries of the district discussed above do not include existing housing. Development plans include thousands of units of new housing. Some of this construction will be affordable housing.

Critics have expressed concerns about the cost of the stadium outweighing potential rewards, public funding for stadiums more generally, and gentrification. Experts on sports economics have produced studies claiming stadiums produce little economic value to the communities where they are located. Supporters contest those arguments.

== Members and supporters ==
Prominent participants and supporters besides the Larry H. Miller Company include Gary Hoogeveen of Rocky Mountain Power, Scott Anderson of Zions Bank, Kem Gardner of the Gardner Company, Ryan Smith owner of the Utah Jazz and the Utah Hockey Club, Governor Spencer Cox, Senators Mike Lee and Mitt Romney; Representatives John Curtis, Blake Moore, and Burgess Owens; and Salt Lake City Mayor Erin Mendenhall and Salt Lake County Mayor Jenny Wilson.

Numerous former professional baseball players supported Big League Utah as of mid-2024.
