= Ryan Smith (businessman) =

American businessman (born 1978)

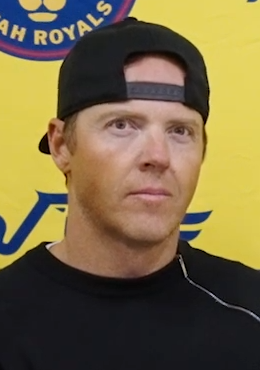
- Smith in 2023
- Born: June 28, 1978 (age 48); Eugene, Oregon, U.S.
- Education: Brigham Young University (BS)
- Occupation: Entrepreneur
- Title: Executive chairman, Qualtrics
- Spouse: Ashley Smith
- Children: 5

Ryan Smith (born June 28, 1978) is an American billionaire businessman and chairman of Smith Entertainment Group. He is the executive chairman and co-founder of Qualtrics, an experience management company based in Provo, Utah. Smith is also owner of the Utah Jazz of the National Basketball Association (NBA) and the Utah Mammoth of the National Hockey League (NHL) in Salt Lake City, and a former co-owner of Real Salt Lake of Major League Soccer (MLS).

== Early life and education ==
Smith was born into a family based in the Church of Jesus Christ of Latter-day Saints in Eugene, Oregon. His father, Scott Smith, worked as a university professor at BYU, and his mother Nancy earned a PhD in information systems. While he was attending Brigham Young University's Marriott School of Business, he founded Qualtrics with his dad and brother, Jared. During his junior year at BYU, Smith dropped out to work on Qualtrics. He later returned to complete his degree in 2016.

== Sports team ownership ==
=== Utah Jazz ===
On October 28, 2020, Smith bought a majority stake in the Utah Jazz of the National Basketball Association (NBA) from Gail Miller. The sale also included the Delta Center, the Salt Lake City Stars of the NBA G League, and management of the Salt Lake Bees. The sale was unanimously approved by the NBA on December 18, 2020.

=== Utah Mammoth ===
As early as 2022, Smith and his Smith Entertainment Group (SEG) discussed moving a National Hockey League (NHL) team to Salt Lake City, either via expansion or relocation. In January 2024, SEG issued a formal request for the NHL to open an expansion process, stating they were "ready to welcome the NHL" to Salt Lake City. SEG officials also said that the team could play immediately at the Delta Center, and perhaps later in a new to-be-constructed arena in the Salt Lake City area. On April 18, 2024, the NHL granted a Utah-based expansion franchise to Smith. In lieu of an expansion draft, Smith purchased the Arizona Coyotes' hockey assets (personnel, draft picks, roster) from Alex Meruelo for $1.2 billion. Meruelo retained the Coyotes brand, allowing Smith to establish his new team. It operated under the interim name of "Utah Hockey Club" in the 2024–25 season before revealing its permanent name, the Utah Mammoth.

=== Real Salt Lake ===
In January 2022, Smith and investor David Blitzer purchased Real Salt Lake of Major League Soccer (MLS) and America First Field, which included affiliate Real Monarchs and Zions Bank Stadium, from Dell Loy Hansen. The pair also reestablished the Utah Royals of the National Women's Soccer League (NWSL) in 2023, with the original team becoming the Kansas City Current in 2020. In April 2025, he sold his interest in Real Salt Lake, the Royals, and America First Field to Miller Sports + Entertainment led by Gail Miller.

== Personal life ==
Smith lives in Provo, Utah. Smith met his wife, Ashley, while attending BYU. Together they have five children. He is a member of The Church of Jesus Christ of Latter-day Saints and spent two years in Mexico as a missionary. In 2016, he was included in Fortune's "40 Under 40." According to Forbes, as of September 10, 2026, Smith's estimated net worth is US$3.3 billion, which places him in the top 1,500 richest individuals in the world.

Sporting positions
Preceded by Gail Miller	Utah Jazz principal owner 2020–present	Incumbent
New creation	Utah Mammoth principal owner 2024–present	Incumbent
