= 2013 BYU Cougars baseball team =

American college baseball season

2013 BYU Cougars baseball
- Conference: West Coast Conference
- Record: 32–21 (15–9 WCC)
- Head coach: Mike Littlewood (1st season)
- Assistant coaches: Trent Pratt; Brett Haring; Jeremy Thomas
- Captains: Brock Whitney; Jaycob Brugman; Adam Law; Desmond Poulson
- Home stadium: Larry H. Miller Field

2013 West Coast Conference baseball standings
	Conf.						Overall
Team	W		L		T	PCT	W		L		T	PCT
Gonzaga ‍†‍‍	18	–	6	–	0	.750	32	–	21	–	1	.602
BYU ‍‍‍	15	–	9	–	0	.625	32	–	21	–	0	.604
San Francisco ‍‍‍^{y}	15	–	9	–	0	.625	37	–	25	–	0	.597
San Diego ‍‍‡‍^{y}	15	–	9	–	0	.625	35	–	24	–	0	.593
Pepperdine ‍‍‍	13	–	11	–	0	.542	27	–	23	–	0	.540
Loyola Marymount ‍‍‍	12	–	12	–	0	.500	24	–	27	–	0	.471
Saint Mary's ‍‍‍	11	–	13	–	0	.458	21	–	34	–	0	.382
Portland ‍‍‍	8	–	16	–	0	.333	18	–	36	–	0	.333
Santa Clara ‍‍‍	1	–	23	–	0	.042	14	–	39	–	0	.264
† – Conference champion ‡ – Tournament champion y – Invited to the NCAA tournament As of June 3, 2013; Rankings from Collegiate Baseball

The 2013 BYU Cougars baseball team represented Brigham Young University in the 2013 NCAA Division I baseball season. Mike Littlewood was in his 1st season as head coach of the Cougars. BYU's baseball team came off a 2012 season in which they were 22–27. The Cougars played their home games at Larry H. Miller Field, part of the Miller Park Baseball/ Softball Complex. Picked to finish sixth in the WCC, BYU stunned most people and finished in a 3-way tie for second place. The Cougars won the #3 seed in the WCC Tournament where they knocked out #1-seed Gonzaga. BYU lost twice to eventual tournament champion San Diego to finish the season 32–21.

== 2013 Roster ==
2013 BYU Cougars Roster
Pitchers: 6 James Lengal – Sophomore; 9 Chunner Nyberg – Junior; 14 Daniel Welch – Senior; 17 Chris Howard – Senior; 18 Keaton Cenatiempo – Freshman; 19 Desmond Poulson – Junior; 21 Marc Oslund – Junior; 22 Adam Miller – Junior; 23 Mark Anderson – Senior; 25 Jeff Barker – Redshirt Sophomore; 28 Matt Milke – Junior; 32 Brandon Erickson – Freshman; 34 Drew Dennis – Junior; 35 Derek Speigner – Redshirt Junior	Infielders: 2 Brennon Anderson – Freshman; 3 Brock Whitney – Junior; 5 Hayden Nielsen – Freshman; 7 Adam Law – Junior; 8 Dillon Robinson – Junior; 13 Bret Lopez – Junior; 26 Trace Hansen – Freshman; 27 Nate Favero – Freshman; 32 Brandon Erickson – Freshman; Utility: 29 Cody Shepherd – Sophomore; 31 Morgan Flinders – Freshman	Catchers: 10 Dakota Hernandez- Sophomore; 11 Collin Brathwaite – Freshman; 16 Jarrett Jarvis – Sophomore; Outfielders: 4 Jaycob Brugman – Junior; 11 Collin Brathwaite – Freshman; 12 Kelton Caldwell – Junior; 24 Jacob Hannemann – Freshman

== Schedule ==
2013 BYU Cougars Game Log
Regular season
February

Date	Opponent	Rank	Site/stadium	Score	Win	Loss	Save	Attendance	Overall record	WCC record
February 15	vs. Northern Colorado	–	Dan Law Field at Rip Griffin Park	9–0	Desmond Poulson (1–0)	Chris Hammer (0–1)	None	117	1–0	–
February 15	vs. Northern Colorado	–	Dan Law Field at Rip Griffin Park	4–6	Jake Johnson (1–0)	James Lengal (0–1)	Josh Tinnon (1)	137	1–1	–
February 16	vs. Northern Illinois	–	Dan Law Field at Rip Griffin Park	5–3	Jeff Barker (1–0)	Jordan Ruckman (0–1)	Matt Milke (1)	197	2–1	–
February 16	at Texas Tech	–	Dan Law Field at Rip Griffin Park	1–5	Trey Masek (1–0)	Adam Miller (0–1)	Jonathon Tripp (1)	2,775	2–2	–
February 21	at #3 LSU	–	Alex Box Stadium/Skip Bertman Field	5–6	Joey Bourgeois (1–0)	Matt Milke (0–1)	None	9,579	2–3	–
February 22	vs. Southeastern Louisiana	–	Alex Box Stadium/Skip Bertman Field	1–4	Dylan Hills (1–0)	Adam Miller (0–2)	None	450	2–4	–
February 23	vs. Southeastern Louisiana	–	Alex Box Stadium/Skip Bertman Field	2–3	Tate Scioneaux (2–0)	Jeff Barker (1–1)	John Gremillion (2)	467	2–5	–
February 23	at #3 LSU	–	Alex Box Stadium/Skip Bertman Field	9–4	Mark Anderson (1–0)	Nate Fury (1–1)	James Lengal (1)	6,742	3–5	–
February 26	at Seattle	–	Bannerwood Park	5–2	Keaton Cenatiempo (1–0)	Garrett Andersen (1–3)	James Lengal (2)	127	4–5	–
February 27	at Seattle	–	Bannerwood Park	10–0	Jeff Barker (2–1)	Skyler Genger (0–3)	None	131	5–5	–

March

Date	Opponent	Rank	Site/stadium	Score	Win	Loss	Save	Attendance	Overall record	WCC record
March 1	Creighton	–	Bruce Hurst Field	9–0	Desmond Poulson (2–0)	Nick Musec (0–1)	None	412	6–5	–
March 1	Creighton	–	Bruce Hurst Field	1–5	Tommy Strunc (1–0)	Adam Miller (0–3)	None	412	6–6	–
March 2	Creighton	–	Bruce Hurst Field	14–5	Matt Milke (1–1)	Mark Lukowski (1–1)	None	407	7–6	–
March 7	#21 UC Irvine	–	Larry H. Miller Field	6–3	Derek Speigner (1–0)	Andrew Thurman (1–2)	None	405	8–6	–
March 8	#21 UC Irvine	–	Larry H. Miller Field	3–1	Adam Miller (1–3)	Matt Whitehouse (2–1)	James Lengal (3)	325	9–6	–
March 9	#21 UC Irvine	–	Larry H. Miller Field	3–8	Andrew Morales (5–0)	Jeff Barker (2–2)	None	1,146	9–7	–
March 14	at San Diego*	–	Fowler Park	5–7	PJ Conlon (4–0)	James Lengal (0–2)	None	662	9–8	0–1
March 15	at San Diego*	–	Fowler Park	3–5	Max Homick (3–0)	Adam Miller (1–4)	Max Mcnabb (2)	882	9–9	0–2
March 16	at San Diego*	–	Fowler Park	9–10 (14)	Sheldon Ekstrand (2–0)	Keaton Cenatiempo (0–1)	None	807	9–10	0–3
March 19	at UNLV	–	Earl Wilson Stadium	3–10	Mark Shannon (3–0)	Mark Anderson (1–1)	None	466	9–11	0–3
March 20	Kansas	–	Larry H. Miller Field	3–0	Desmond Poulson (3–0)	Tanner Poppe (1–1)	None	758	10–11	0–3
March 21	Kansas	–	Larry H. Miller Field	4–15	Frank Duncan (2–2)	Adam Miller (1–5)	None	744	10–12	0–3
March 23	Kansas	–	Larry H. Miller Field	6–3	Jeff Barker (3–2)	Wes Benjamin (2–3)	James Lengal (4)	223	11–12	0–3
March 26	at Utah	–	Spring Mobile Ballpark	4–5 (10)	Josh Chapman (3–1)	James Lengal (0–3)	None	1,268	11–13	0–3
March 28	Pepperdine*	–	Larry H. Miller Field	8–3	Derek Speigner (2–0)	Eric Karch (5–2)	None	777	12–13	1–3
March 29	Pepperdine*	–	Larry H. Miller Field	10–9	Mark Anderson (2–1)	Scott Frazier (2–4)	Derek Speigner (1)	1,023	13–13	2–3
March 30	Pepperdine*	–	Larry H. Miller Field	6–9	Aaron Brown (2–1)	Keaton Cenatiempo (1–2)	Michael Swanner (6)	1,593	13–14	2–4

April

Date	Opponent	Rank	Site/stadium	Score	Win	Loss	Save	Attendance	Overall record	WCC record
April 2	Utah Valley	–	Larry H. Miller Field	8–0	Mark Anderson (3–1)	Devin Nelson (1–3)	None	1,159	14–14	2–4
April 4	at Santa Clara*	–	Stephen Schott Stadium	3–1	Desmond Poulson (4–0)	Reece Karalus (0–6)	None	183	15–14	3–4
April 5	at Santa Clara*	–	Stephen Schott Stadium	8–2	Adam Miller (2–6)	Mike Couch (3–5)	Matt Milke (2)	381	16–14	4–4
April 6	at Santa Clara*	–	Stephen Schott Stadium	5–2	Derek Speigner (3–0)	Max Deering (1–3)	None	284	17–14	5–4
April 8	Washington State	–	Larry H. Miller Field	Cancelled due to weather						
April 11	Portland*	–	Larry H. Miller Field	4–8	Billy Sahlinger (2–2)	Adam Miller (2–6)	None	744	17–15	5–5
April 12	at Portland*	–	Larry H. Miller Field	11–7	Desmond Poulson (5–0)	Kurt Yinger (2–3)	None	994	18–15	6–5
April 13	at Portland*	–	Larry H. Miller Field	7–6	Matt Milke (2–1)	J. R. Bunda (0–2)	None	1,058	19–15	7–5
April 23	Utah	–	Larry H. Miller Field	9–3	Keaton Cenatiempo (2–2)	Chase Rezac (0–3)	None	1,432	20–15	7–5
April 25	at #22 Gonzaga*	–	Washington Trust Field and Patterson Baseball Complex	4–6	Marco Gonzales (6–2)	Desmond Poulson (5–1)	Arturo Reyes (3)	715	20–16	7–6
April 26	at #22 Gonzaga*	–	Washington Trust Field and Patterson Baseball Complex	1–5	Tyler Olson (8–2)	Jeff Barker (3–3)	None	1,539	20–17	7–7
April 27	at #22 Gonzaga*	–	Washington Trust Field and Patterson Baseball Complex	9–6	Adam Miller (3–6)	Arturo Reyes (5–2)	Matt Milke (3)	705	21–17	8–7
April 30	at Utah Valley	–	Brent Brown Ballpark	15–7	Mark Anderson (4–1)	Ryan Evans (2–1)	None	5,133	22–17	8–7

May

Date	Opponent	Rank	Site/stadium	Score	Win	Loss	Save	Attendance	Overall record	WCC record
May 2	at Loyola Marymount*	–	George C. Page Stadium	8–3	Desmond Poulson (6–1)	Colin Welmon (5–4)	None	126	23–17	9–7
May 3	at Loyola Marymount*	–	George C. Page Stadium	3–2	Jeff Barker (4–3)	Aaron Griffin (3–5)	None	204	24–17	10–7
May 4	at Loyola Marymount*	–	George C. Page Stadium	1–2	Patrick Mcgrath (4–2)	Adam Miller (3–7)	Bret Dhalson (7)	485	24–18	10–8
May 7	at Utah	–	Spring Mobile Ballpark	Cancelled due to weather						
May 9	San Francisco*	–	Larry H. Miller Field	1–10	Abe Bobb (5–5)	Desmond Poulson (6–2)	None	786	24–19	10–9
May 10	San Francisco*	–	Larry H. Miller Field	10–9	Derek Speigner (4–0)	Logan West (0–1)	None	955	25–19	11–9
May 11	San Francisco*	–	Larry H. Miller Field	6–4	James Lengal (1–3)	Adam Cimber (5–3)	None	1,568	26–19	12–9
May 14	Utah	–	Larry H. Miller Field	5–4	Matt Milke (3–1)	Nick Green (0–2)	None	1,327	27–19	12–9
May 16	Saint Mary's*	–	Larry H. Miller Field	11–1	Desmond Poulson (7–2)	Ben Griset (4–4)	None	1,133	28–19	13–9
May 17	Saint Mary's*	–	Larry H. Miller Field	6–3	Jeff Baker (5–3)	Jordan Mills (4–4)	Matt Milke (4)	1,131	29–19	14–9
May 18	Saint Mary's*	–	Larry H. Miller Field	14–3	Adam Miller (4–7)	Gary Cornish (2–6)	None	1,032	30–19	15–9
May 21	at #18 Arizona State	–	Packard Stadium	8–3	Mark Anderson (5–1)	Billy Young (0–2)	None	2,957	31–19	15–9

WCC Tournament
May

Date	Opponent	Rank	Site/stadium	Score	Win	Loss	Save	Attendance	Overall record	Tournament record
May 23	(2) San Diego*	–	Banner Island Ballpark	8–9 (10)	Max Homick (5–1)	Matt Milke (3–2)	None	838	31–20	0–1
May 24	(1) Gonzaga*	–	Banner Island Ballpark	8–1	Jeff Barker (6–3)	Tyler Olson (9–4)	None	707	32–20	1–1
May 24	(2) San Diego*	–	Banner Island Ballpark	4–7	Louie Lechich (3–3)	Adam Miller (4–8)	Max Homick (5)	904	32–21	1–2

Rankings from USA TODAY/ESPN Top 25 coaches' baseball poll. Parenthesis indicate tournament seedings.
*West Coast Conference games

== TV & Radio Information ==
All conference games, most home games, and select road games (at Utah, UNLV, and Utah Valley) were broadcast on KOVO with Brent Norton (play-by-play) calling the games for his 24th consecutive season. A rotating selection of analysts was used. Jeff Bills acted as analyst for games in California, Nevada, & Utah while Gary Pullins called the games in Oregon & Washington. Pullins was used as the sole analyst for the WCC Tournament. Many of these broadcasts were also broadcast on BYU Radio.

BYUtv broadcast 9 home games (Mar. 21 vs. Kansas, Mar. 29 vs. Pepperdine, Apr. 2 vs. Utah Valley, Apr. 12 vs. Portland, May 10–11 vs. San Francisco, and May 16–18 vs. Saint Mary's). BYUtv used a broadcast team of Robbie Bullough as play-by-play man on weekday games, Dave McCann as play-by-play man on Saturday's, and Gary Sheide as the analyst. The WCC Tournament games were broadcast on WCC Network with a team of Andy Masur (play-by-play), Keith Ramsey (analyst), and Amanda Blackwell (reporter).

== Post-season awards ==
4 BYU Cougars- Jaycob Brugman, Jacob Hanneman, Adam Law, and Brock Whitney were selected to the 2013 All-Conference Baseball Team.

4 members of the 2013 BYU Cougars baseball team, and 1 incoming Junior College Player, were drafted in the 2013 Major League Baseball draft. NCAA Rules allow players drafted to return as long as they don't sign a contract with the team that has drafted them. Should they do so, they will be eligible to be drafted again next season as rights last only for 1 year for members who don't sign a contract with the team who drafts them. All the drafted Cougar players would sign the contracts and go professional instead of returning.

Name	Number	Pos.	Height	Weight	Year	Hometown	Notes
Jacob Hannemann	24	OF	6'1"	195	Freshman	Alpine, Utah	Selected 3rd Round, 75th pick, by the Chicago Cubs
Adam Law	7	2B/SS	6'1"	193	Junior	Provo, Utah	Selected 12th Round, 364th pick, by the Los Angeles Dodgers
Jaycob Brugman	4	OF	6'0"	195	Junior	Phoenix, Arizona	Selected 17th Round, 521st pick, by the Oakland Athletics
Adam Miller	22	RHP	6'2"	190	Junior	Yucaipa, California	Selected 20th round, 600th pick, by the Arizona Diamondbacks
JC Snyder	28	RHP/3B	6'2"	170	Sophomore	Salem, Utah	JC Transfer who spent Freshman and Sophomore years at SLCC, Selected 36th Round, 1,077th pick, by the Seattle Mariners
