= Mike Littlewood =

American college baseball coach (born 1966)

Biographical details
- Born: 1966 (age 59–60)

Playing career
- 1985–1988: BYU
- 1988: Beloit Brewers
- Position: Third baseman / Shortstop

Coaching career (HC unless noted)
- 1993–1995: Salt Lake City (UT) Alta
- 1996–2012: Dixie State Red Storm^{(Rebels until 2009)}
- 2013–2022: BYU Cougars

Head coaching record
- Overall: 867–457

Accomplishments and honors

Championships
- 3× WCC regular season (2016, 2017, 2019); WCC tournament (2017)

Awards
- WCC Coach of the Year (2019)

Michael Rory Littlewood is an American baseball coach. He played college baseball at BYU from 1985 to 1988, before playing professionally in 1988. He then served as the head coach of then Dixie State Rebels (later called "Red Storm", now Utah Tech Trailblazers) from 1996-2012, and then the BYU Cougars (2013–2022.)

== Playing career ==
Littlewood was a third baseman at BYU, earning All-Conference as both a junior and senior. He was drafted in the 27th round of the 1988 MLB draft by the Milwaukee Brewers and played one season at Class-A Beloit Brewers.

== Coaching career ==
Shortly after his playing career ended, Littlewood accepted the head coaching position at Alta High School in Sandy, Utah. He remained for three seasons before moving to Dixie State, then a junior college in St. George, Utah. Under Littlewood, the Rebels (and Red Storm) won 563 games, won one national championship, made four appearances in the National Junior College World Series, and claimed eight league titles. Littlewood was named National JUCO Coach of the Year in 2004. Dixie State transitioned to the Division II level under Littlewood in 2007. Littlewood also served during this time as an NCAA basketball referee, working three NCAA Sweet 16s and two Elite 8s.

After being a finalist for the BYU head coaching position in 2000, when Vance Law earned the job, Littlewood was hired at BYU prior to the 2013 season. In his first season, the Cougars tied for second in the West Coast Conference and qualified for the first WCC tournament.

He was named the West Coast Conference Coach of the Year in 2019. On April 11, 2022, Littlewood resigned midseason for personal reasons.

== Head coaching record ==
This table shows Littlewood's record as a head coach at the Division I level.

Record table
Season	Team	Overall	Conference	Standing	Postseason
Dixie State Rebels (Scenic West Conference) (1996–2006)
Dixie State Rebels/Red Storm (Independent) (2007–2008)
2007	Dixie State	25–20			
2008	Dixie State	25–22			
Dixie State Red Storm (Pacific West Conference) (2009–2012)
2009	Dixie State	33–19	15–9	1st	
2010	Dixie State	31–19	19–13	2nd	
2011	Dixie State	32–15	22–10	1st	
2012	Dixie State	35–20	25–15	2nd	NCAA Regional
Dixie State:		605–249 (.708)			
BYU Cougars (West Coast Conference) (2013–2022)
2013	BYU	32–21	15–9	T-2nd	WCC tournament (Note: The top four finishers in the nine team WCC qualified for the tournament in 2013.)
2014	BYU	22–31	12–15	7th	
2015	BYU	28–25	16–11	T-3rd	WCC tournament (Note: The top four finishers in the nine team WCC qualified for the tournament in 2015.)
2016	BYU	37–17	18–9	T-1st	WCC tournament (Note: The top four finishers in the nine team WCC qualified for the tournament in 2016.)
2017	BYU	38–21	20–7	T-1st	NCAA Stanford Regionals
2018	BYU	22–28	11–16	T-9th	
2019	BYU	36–17	19–8	1st	WCC tournament
2020	BYU	7–9	0–0		Season canceled due to COVID-19
2021	BYU	23–27	15–12	4th	
2022	BYU	17–12	7–3		
BYU:		262–208 (.557)	133–90 (.596)		
Total:		867–457 (.655)			
National champion Postseason invitational champion Conference regular season champion Conference regular season and conference tournament champion Division regular season champion Division regular season and conference tournament champion Conference tournament champion
