= BYU Cougars baseball =

- 2026 BYU Cougars baseball team
- Founded: 1909
- University: Brigham Young University
- Athletic director: Brian Santiago
- Head coach: Trent Pratt (4th full, 5th overall season)
- Conference: Big 12 Conference
- Location: Provo, Utah
- Home stadium: Larry H. Miller Field (Capacity: 2,204)
- Nickname: Cougars
- Colors: Blue and white

College World Series appearances
- 1968, 1971

NCAA tournament appearances
- 1958, 1962, 1968, 1971, 1979, 1980, 1981, 1983, 1985, 1988, 1989, 1990, 1994, 2001, 2002, 2017

Conference tournament champions
- Western Athletic Conference; 1983, 1985, 1988, 1994; Mountain West Conference; 2001, 2002; West Coast Conference; 2017

Conference regular season champions
- Mountain States Conference; 1949, 1952, 1958, 1961; Western Athletic Conference; 1968, 1971, 1979, 1981, 1983, 1985, 1989, 1994; Mountain West Conference; 2001; West Coast Conference; 2016, 2017, 2019

The BYU Cougars baseball team is a varsity intercollegiate athletic team of Brigham Young University in Provo, Utah, United States. The team is a member of the Big 12 Conference, which is part of the National Collegiate Athletic Association's Division I. BYU's first baseball team was fielded in 1908. The team plays its home games at Larry H. Miller Field in Provo, Utah. The Cougars are coached by Trent Pratt.

== Head coaches ==
Year(s)	Coach	Seasons	Overall record	Pct
1908	Clayton Teetzel	1		
1909, 11–12	Fred Bennion	3		
1914–15	Dell Webb	2		
1918, 20	E.L. Roberts	2		
1948	Stan Watts	1	3–0	1.000
1949–51	Wayne Soffe	3	19–13–1	.591
1952–55	Dave Crowton	4	33–28	.541
1956	Wayne Tucker	1	9–8	.529
1957–59	Jay VanNoy	3	50–24–1	.673
1960–76	Glen Tuckett	17	445–256–4	.634
1977–99	Gary Pullins	23	913–462–6	.663
2000–12	Vance Law	13	397–348–2	.539
2013–2022	Mike Littlewood	10	262–208	.557
2022–present	Trent Pratt	3	61–68	.473

== Season results ==
Year	Coach	Overall record	Conference record	Conference standing	Postseason
1956	Wayne Tucker	9–8			
1957	Jay VanNoy	7–10			
1958	Jay VanNoy	13–5			CWS*
1959	Jay VanNoy	14–6			
1960	Glen Tuckett	12–13			
1961	Glen Tuckett	27–6–1			
1962	Glen Tuckett	26–10			NCAA First Round
		108-58-1			
Western Athletic Conference 1963–1999
1963	Glen Tuckett	22–12–1	7–1	1st Northern	—
1964	Glen Tuckett	16–16	5–5	2nd Northern	—
1965	Glen Tuckett	23–15	4–8	3rd Northern	—
1966	Glen Tuckett	22–16–1	6–6	2nd Northern	—
1967	Glen Tuckett	33–14	8–4	1st Northern	—
1968	Glen Tuckett	31–17	8–4	1st Northern	CWS Elite Eight
1969	Glen Tuckett	30–15	13–5	1st Northern	—
1970	Glen Tuckett	31–14–1	14–3	1st Northern	—
1971	Glen Tuckett	32–16	12–4	1st Northern	CWS Elite Eight
1972	Glen Tuckett	33–15	12–6	1st Northern	—
1973	Glen Tuckett	30–20	13–5	1st Northern	—
1974	Glen Tuckett	19–17	12–5	1st Northern	—
1975	Glen Tuckett	22–19	15–1	1st Northern	—
1976	Glen Tuckett	26–21	15–3	1st Northern	—
1977	Gary Pullins	35–17	16–2	1st Northern	—
1978	Gary Pullins	37–15	16–2	1st Northern	—
1979	Gary Pullins	50–25–1	16–1	1st Northern	NCAA Sweet Sixteen
1980	Gary Pullins	41–18	14–3	1st Northern	NCAA Second Round
1981	Gary Pullins	46–24	21–3	1st Northern	NCAA First Round
1982	Gary Pullins	43–16	20–4	1st Northern	—
1983	Gary Pullins	54–11	23–1	1st Northern	NCAA First Round
1984	Gary Pullins	42–17	18–5	1st Northern	—
1985	Gary Pullins	44–29	18–5	1st Northern	NCAA Second Round
1986	Gary Pullins	34–18–2	14–10	3rd Western	—
1987	Gary Pullins	42–22	20–4	1st Eastern	—
1988	Gary Pullins	41–18–1	20–5–1	2nd	NCAA Second Round
1989	Gary Pullins	47–20	21–7	1st	NCAA First Round
1990	Gary Pullins	43–25–1	20–7–1	2nd	NCAA Third Round
1991	Gary Pullins	35–15	16–7	3rd	—
1992	Gary Pullins	38–19	17–9	3rd	—
1993	Gary Pullins	39–18	16–6	1st East	—
1994	Gary Pullins	37–20	16–7	1st East	NCAA Sweet Sixteen
1995	Gary Pullins	36–25–1	22–8	1st East	—
1996	Gary Pullins	38–19	20–8	1st East	—
1997	Gary Pullins	37–18	21–9	2nd North	—
1998	Gary Pullins	29–24	13–17	2nd North	—
1999	Gary Pullins	26–31	12–17	9th	—
		1164-691-9			
Mountain West Conference 2000–2011
2000	Vance Law	29–29	15–15	3rd	—
2001	Vance Law	38–22	21–8	1st	NCAA First Round
2002	Vance Law	31–31–1	15–14	3rd	NCAA Regional Finals
2003	Vance Law	30–24	18–12	2nd	—
2004	Vance Law	28–30	18–12	4th	—
2005	Vance Law	39–19–1	21–9	2nd	—
2006	Vance Law	33–28	14–8	2nd	—
2007	Vance Law	37–20	17–7	2nd	—
2008	Vance Law	22–36	10–14	4th	—
2009	Vance Law	30–24	14–8	3rd	—
2010	Vance Law	27–31	12–12	4th	—
2011	Vance Law	31–27	11–12	3rd	—
		375-321-2			
West Coast Conference (2012–2023)
2012	Vance Law	22–27	10–14	7th	—
2013	Mike Littlewood	33–21	15–9	2nd	—
2014	Mike Littlewood	22–31	12–15	7th	—
2015	Mike Littlewood	28–26	16–11	3rd	—
2016	Mike Littlewood	37–17	18–10	1st	—
2017	Mike Littlewood	38–21	20–7	1st	NCAA Second Round
2018	Mike Littlewood	22–28	11–16	10th	—
2019	Mike Littlewood	36–17	19–8	1st	—
2020	Mike Littlewood	7–9	0–0	—	—
2021	Mike Littlewood	23–27	15–12	4th	—
2022	Mike Littlewood	17–12	6–6	—	—
2022	Trent Pratt	16–9	10–5	4th	—
2023	Trent Pratt	24–28	13–14	7th	—
		301–245			
Big 12 Conference (2024–)
2024	Trent Pratt	21-31	7-23	13th	—
2025	Trent Pratt	28-27	10-20	12th	—
		49–58			
Totals		1997–1373–12			

- BYU advanced to the 1958 College World Series but withdrew due to the university's no-Sunday play policy.

== Notable former players ==
- Danny Ainge
- Rick Aguilera
- Bert Bradley
- Jaycob Brugman
- Matt Carson
- Taylor Cole
- Gary Cooper (outfielder)
- Gary Cooper (third baseman)
- Ken Crosby
- John DeSilva
- Jeremy Guthrie
- Jacob Hannemann
- Doug Howard
- Dane Iorg
- Wally Joyner
- Gary Kroll
- Vance Law
- Mike Littlewood
- Jack Morris
- Scott Nielsen
- Jerry Nyman
- Cliff Pastornicky
- Cory Snyder
- Kevin Towers
- Daniel Schneemann

== See also ==
- List of NCAA Division I baseball programs
