= 2018 BYU Cougars baseball team =

American college baseball season

2018 BYU Cougars baseball
- Conference: West Coast Conference
- Record: 22–28 (11–16 WCC)
- Head coach: Mike Littlewood (6th season)
- Assistant coaches: Trent Pratt (6th season); Brent Haring (6th season); Jeremy Thomas (6th season)
- Home stadium: Larry H. Miller Field

2018 West Coast Conference baseball standings
	Conf.				Overall
Team	W		L	PCT	W		L	PCT
Pepperdine ‍†‍‍	17	–	10	.630	31	–	24	.564
Gonzaga ‍‍‡‍^{y}	16	–	11	.593	33	–	24	.579
San Francisco ‍‍‍	15	–	12	.556	28	–	30	.483
Loyola Marymount ‍‍‍	14	–	12	.538	25	–	30	.455
Saint Mary's ‍‍‍	14	–	13	.519	31	–	23	.574
Santa Clara ‍‍‍	12	–	15	.444	26	–	26	.500
Portland ‍‍‍	12	–	15	.444	23	–	30	.434
San Diego ‍‍‍	12	–	15	.444	23	–	32	.418
Pacific ‍‍‍	11	–	16	.407	22	–	27	.449
BYU ‍‍‍	11	–	16	.407	22	–	28	.440
† – Conference champion ‡ – Tournament champion y – Invited to the NCAA tournament As of Jun 3, 2018; Rankings from Collegiate Baseball

The 2018 BYU Cougars baseball team represented Brigham Young University in the 2018 NCAA Division I baseball season. Mike Littlewood acted in his sixth season as head coach of the Cougars. The Cougars overcame expectations in 2017 and claimed a tri-team championship in the regular season. Afterwards the Cougars won the West Coast Conference tournament for the first time in their history, claiming the conferences automatic bid to the NCAA tournament, the Cougars first tournament berth since 2002. The Cougars were placed in the Stanford Regional where they would go 1–2. The Cougars finished the season 38–21. For 2018 BYU was picked to finish first in the WCC Pre-season rankings.

== 2018 roster ==
2018 BYU Cougars roster
Pitchers: 6 Mitch McIntyre - Freshman; 8 Rhett Parkinson - Senior; 14 Blake Inouye - Junior; 18 Justin Sterner - Freshman; 21 Kenny Saenz - Junior; 23 Hayden Rodgers - Senior; 24 Drew Zimmerman - Freshman; 26 Riley Gates - Senior; 27 Alex Perron - Junior; 32 Walker Sigman - Freshman; 34 Jordan Wood - Junior; 35 James Barker - Freshman; 37 Ryan Brady - Freshman; 41 Kendall Motes - Senior; 42 Bo Burrup - Junior; 43 Jake Suddreth - Sophomore	Infielders: 2 Noah Hill - Junior; 3 Brennon Anderson - Senior; 4 Cam Richins - Sophomore; 9 Paxton Larson - Sophomore; 10 Daniel Schneemann - Junior; 11 Mackay Jacobsen - Junior; 12 Colton Kent - Freshman; 13 Brian Hsu - Junior; 16 Casey Jacobsen - Junior; 19 Koby Kelton - Freshman; 25 Nate Favero - Senior	Catchers: 2 Noah Hill - Junior; 11 Mackay Jacobsen - Junior; 22 David Clawson - Sophomore; 28 Dustin Thelander - Freshman; 31 Cooper Hansen - Freshman; Outfielders: 3 Brennon Anderson - Senior; 5 Jarrett Perns - Junior; 6 Mitch McIntyre - Freshman; 7 Kyle Dean - (redshirt) Sophomore; 17 Keaton Kringlen - Junior; 19 Koby Kelton - Freshman; 36 Jake Brown - Sophomore; 44 Brock Hale - Junior

== Schedule ==
2018 BYU Cougars Game Log
Regular season
February

Date	Opponent	Rank	Site/stadium	Television	Score	Win	Loss	Save	Attendance	Overall record	WCC record
February 16	at CSUN	–	Matador Field	Big West TV	5–3	Jake Suddreth (1–0)	Matt Acosta (0–1)	Riley Gates (1)	512	1–0	–
February 17	at CSUN	–	Matador Field	Facebook	9–10	Hayden Shenefield (1–0)	Drew Zimmerman (0–1)	None	451	1–1	–
February 17	at CSUN	–	Matador Field	Facebook	6–5	Hayden Rogers (1–0)	Wesley Moore (0–1)	Riley Gates (2)	590	2–1	–
February 19	at CSUN	–	Matador Field	Big West TV	10–8	Bo Burrup (1–0)	Matt Acosta (0–2)	Drew Zimmerman (1)	276	3–1	–
February 22	at Hawai'i	–	Les Murakami Stadium	Facebook	2–3	Kyle Hatton (1–0)	Blake Inouye (0–1)	Dylan Thomas (3)	2,211	3–2	–
February 23	at Hawai'i	–	Les Murakami Stadium	Facebook	4–3 (10)	Riley Gates (1–0)	Colin Ashworth (0–1)	Jake Suddreth (1)	2,804	4–2	–
February 24	at Hawai'i	–	Les Murakami Stadium	Facebook	4–3	Hayden Rogers (2–0)	Neil Uskali (1–1)	Jake Suddreth (2)	2,757	5–2	–
February 24	at Hawai'i	–	Les Murakami Stadium	Facebook	3–8	Logan Pouelsen (1–0)	Kenny Saenz (0–1)	None	2,757	5–3	–

March

Date	Opponent	Rank	Site/stadium	Television	Score	Win	Loss	Save	Attendance	Overall record	WCC record
March 2	at #18 Auburn	–	Plainsman Park	SEC+	3–4	Casey Mize (3–0)	Jordan Wood (0–1)	Calvin Coker (2)	3,401	5–4	–
March 3	at #18 Auburn	–	Plainsman Park	Facebook	4–21	Daniel Davis (2–0)	Hayden Rogers (2–1)	None	4,021	5–5	–
March 3	at #18 Auburn	–	Plainsman Park	Facebook	5–9	Tanner Burns (2–0)	Kenny Saenz (0–2)	Cody Greenhill (2)	4,021	5–6	–
March 8	Omaha	–	Larry H. Miller Field	TheW.tv	8–1	Jordan Wood (1–1)	Grant Suponchick (1–1)	None	1,288	6–6	–
March 9	Omaha	–	Larry H. Miller Field	TheW.tv	13–3	Blake Inouye (1–1)	Joey Machado (0–3)	None	1,362	7–6	–
March 10	Omaha	–	Larry H. Miller Field	BYUtv	6–4	Drew Zimmerman (1–1)	Jake Pennington (2–2)	Jake Suddreth (3)	1,731	8–6	–
March 13	Utah Valley	–	Larry H. Miller Field	BYUtv	9–3	Kenny Saenz (1–2)	Marco Briones (0–1)	None	1,743	9–6	–
March 15/16	Loyola Marymount*	–	Larry H. Miller Field	TheW.tv	4–7	Matt Voelker (1–1)	Blake Inouye (1–2)	None	1,652	9–7	0–1
March 16	Loyola Marymount*	–	Larry H. Miller Field	TheW.tv	8–9 (12)	Josh Robbins (1–1)	Jake Suddreth (1–1)	None	1,652	9–8	0–2
March 17	Loyola Marymount*	–	Larry H. Miller Field	BYUtv	4–9	Nick Frasso (2–2)	Hayden Rogers (2–2)	None	1,110	9–9	0–3
March 20	Utah	–	Larry H. Miller Field	BYUtv	7–6 (10)	Jake Suddreth (2–1)	Trenton Stolz (0–1)	None	1,902	10–9	–
March 22	Gonzaga*	–	Larry H. Miller Field	ESPNU	6–4	Jordan Wood (2–1)	Alex Jacob (1–3)	Drew Zimmerman (2)	955	11–9	1–3
March 23	Gonzaga*	–	Larry H. Miller Field	BYUtv	6–2	Hayden Rogers (3–2)	Daniel Bies (3–2)	None	1,587	12–9	2–3
March 24	Gonzaga*	–	Larry H. Miller Field	BYUtv	3–4	Casey Legumina (2–1)	Bo Burrup (1–1)	None	1,668	12–10	2–4
March 27	at Utah Valley	–	UCCU Ballpark	UVUtv; WAC DN	14–2	Kendall Motes (1–0)	Paxton Schultz (1–2)	None	2,108	13–10	–
March 29	at Pepperdine*	–	Eddy D. Field Stadium	TheW.tv	0–2	Wil Jensen (5–0)	Jordan Wood (2–2)	Jordan Qsar (2)	307	13–11	2–5
March 30	at Pepperdine*	–	Eddy D. Field Stadium	TheW.tv	13–6	Hayden Rogers (4–2)	Christian Stotland (3–1)	Drew Zimmerman (3)	357	14–11	3–5
March 31	at Pepperdine*	–	Eddy D. Field Stadium	TheW.tv	2–5	Jonathan Pendergast (1–4)	Blake Inouye (1–3)	Jordan Qsar (3)	413	14–12	3–6

April

Date	Opponent	Rank	Site/stadium	Television	Score	Win	Loss	Save	Attendance	Overall record	WCC record
April 3	at Utah	–	Smith's Ballpark	P12 MTN	3–4	Josh Lapiana (1–2)	Jake Suddreth (2–2)	Trenton Stoltz (2)	2,920	14–13	–
April 5	Santa Clara*	–	Larry H. Miller Field	BYUtv	2–1	Drew Zimmerman (2–1)	Eric Lex (2–4)	None	1,717	15–13	4–6
April 6	Santa Clara*	–	Larry H. Miller Field	TheW.tv	6–4 (10)	Bo Burrup (2–1)	Michael Praszker (0–1)	None	1,821	16–13	5–6
April 6	Santa Clara*	–	Larry H. Miller Field	TheW.tv	6–5	Rhett Parinkson (1–0)	Alex Waldsmith (0–4)	None	1,821	17–13	6–6
April 12	at Portland*	–	Joe Etzel Field	TheW.tv	3–4	Christian Peters (1–0)	Jordan Wood (2–3)	Connor Knutson (5)	242	17–14	6–7
April 13	at Portland*	–	Joe Etzel Field	TheW.tv	6–2	Hayden Rogers (5–2)	Eli Morse (2–5)	None	302	18–14	7–6
April 14	at Portland*	–	Joe Etzel Field	TheW.tv	6–8	Tate Budnick (2–1)	Justin Sterner (0–1)	Connor Knutson (6)	284	18–15	7–7
April 17	at Arizona	–	Hi Corbett Field	P12	1–6	Juan Aguilera (5–0)	Jordan Wood (2–4)	None	2,471	18–16	–
April 24	Utah	–	Larry H. Miller Field	KBYU	4–8	Spencer Kevin Johnson (1–0)	Rhett Parkinson (1–1)	None	2,605	18–17	–
April 26	San Diego*	–	Larry H. Miller Field	BYUtv	9–1	Jordan Wood (3–4)	Anthony Donatella (2–4)	None	1,365	19–17	8–7
April 27	San Diego*	–	Larry H. Miller Field	TheW.tv	6–11	Paul Richan (3–4)	Hayden Rogers (5–3)	None	2,035	19–18	8–8
April 28	San Diego*	–	Larry H. Miller Field	BYUtv	5–9	Chris Murphy (5–4)	Blake Inouye (1–4)	None	2,367	19–19	8–9

May

Date	Opponent	Rank	Site/stadium	Television	Score	Win	Loss	Save	Attendance	Overall record	WCC record
May 1	at Cal	–	Evans Diamond	P12	0–1	Tanner Dodson (2–0)	Bo Burrup (2–2)	None	353	19–20	–
May 3	at Saint Mary's*	–	Louis Guisto Field	TheW.tv	1–2	Ty Madrigal (2–1)	Blake Inouye (1–5)	None	108	19–21	8–10
May 4	at Saint Mary's*	–	Louis Guisto Field	TheW.tv	3–7	Ken Waldichuk (8–2)	Hayden Rogers (5–4)	Andrew Hansen (1)	215	19–22	8–11
May 5	at Saint Mary's*	–	Louis Guisto Field	TheW.tv	1–10	Nick Frank (5–4)	Drew Zimmerman (2–2)	None	449	19–23	8–12
May 8	at Utah	–	Smith's Ballpark	P12 MTN	3–6						–
May 10	at San Francisco*	–	Dante Benedetti Diamond at Max Ulrich Field	TheW.tv	9–2					–	–
May 11	at San Francisco*	–	Dante Benedetti Diamond at Max Ulrich Field	TheW.tv	9–7						–
May 12	at San Francisco*	–	Dante Benedetti Diamond at Max Ulrich Field	TheW.tv	2–6						–
May 15	at Stanford	–	Klein Field at Sunken Diamond	P12+ STAN	1–5					–	–
May 17	Pacific*	–	Larry H. Miller Field	BYUtv	3–1						–
May 18	Pacific*	–	Larry H. Miller Field	BYUtv	3–9						–
May 19	Pacific*	–	Larry H. Miller Field	BYUtv	5–6						–

Rankings from Collegiate Baseball. Parenthesis indicate tournament seedings.
*West Coast Conference games

== Rivalries ==
BYU has two main rivalries on their schedule- the Deseret First Duel vs. Utah and the UCCU Crosstown Clash vs. Utah Valley.

== Radio Information ==
BYU Baseball broadcasts were officially made part of the NuSkin BYU Sports Network broadcast package for the 2018 season. BYU Radio and KOVO will serve as the flagship station with each station carrying most of the games and some exclusives (KOVO has exclusives on Feb 24 (Gm 1), Mar 3, Mar 17, & Mar 31; BYU Radio has exclusives on Mar 8, 9, & 16). Brent Norton returns to provide play-by-play for his 26th consecutive season. Tuckett Slade will provide analysis for most games, but a small selection of former players will also be used.

== TV Announcers ==
- Feb 16: Ross Porter
- Feb 17 (DH): Tuckett Slade
- Feb 19: Ross Porter
- Feb 22: Tuckett Slade
- Feb 23: Brent Norton & Tuckett Slade
- Feb 24 (Gm 1): Brent Norton & Tuckett Slade
- Feb 24 (Gm 2): Tuckett Slade
- Mar 2: Brad Law & Mark Fuller
- Mar 3 (DH): Brent Norton & Tuckett Slade
- Mar 8: Brent Norton & Tuckett Slade
- Mar 9: Brent Norton & Tuckett Slade
- Mar 10: Dave McCann, Gary Sheide, & Jason Shepherd
- Mar. 13: Spencer Linton, Gary Sheide, & Jason Shepherd
- Mar. 15: Brent Norton & Tuckett Slade
- Mar. 16: Brent Norton & Tuckett Slade
- Mar. 17: Spencer Linton, Gary Sheide, & Jason Shepherd
- Mar. 20: Jarom Jordan, Gary Sheide, & Jason Shepherd
- Mar. 22: Roxy Bernstein & Wes Clements
- Mar. 23: Spencer Linton, Gary Sheide, & Jason Shepherd
- Mar. 24: Dave McCann, Gary Sheide, & Jason Shepherd
- Mar. 27: Jordan Bianucci & Ryan Pickens
- Mar. 29: Al Epstein
- Mar. 30: Sam Farber, Keith Ramsey, & Sammy O'Brien
- Mar. 31: Al Epstein
- Apr. 3: Daron Sutton & Ben Francisco
- Apr. 5: Spencer Linton, Gary Sheide, & Jason Shepherd
- Apr. 6 (Gm 1): Brent Norton & Jeff Bills
- Apr. 6 (Gm 2): Brent Norton & Tuckett Slade
- Apr. 12: No commentary
- Apr. 13: No commentary
- Apr. 14: No commentary
- Apr. 17: Daron Sutton & Ben Francisco
- Apr. 24: Spencer Linton, Gary Sheide, & Jason Shepherd
- Apr. 26: Spencer Linton, Gary Sheide, & Jason Shepherd
- Apr. 27: Robbie Bullough & Marc Oslund
- Apr. 28: Dave McCann, Gary Sheide, & Jason Shepherd
- May 1: Ted Robinson & J.T. Snow
- May 3: Alex Jensen & Austin Lonestar
- May 4: George Devine & Alex Jensen
- May 5: Dean Burner
- May 8: Thad Anderson & Kevin Stocker
- May 10: Cheyene Inman
- May 11: Pat Olsen
- May 12:
- May 15: Kevin Danna & Tim Swartz
- May 17:
- May 18:
- May 19:
