= 2021 BYU Cougars baseball team =

American college baseball season

2021 BYU Cougars baseball
- Conference: West Coast Conference
- Record: 23–27 (15–12 WCC)
- Head coach: Mike Littlewood (9th season)
- Assistant coaches: Trent Pratt (9th season); Brent Haring (9th season); Michael Bradshaw (3rd season)
- Home stadium: Larry H. Miller Field

2021 West Coast Conference baseball standings
	Conf.				Overall
Team	W		L	PCT	W		L	PCT
No. 25 Gonzaga ‍†‍‍^{y}	20	–	7	.741	34	–	19	.642
San Diego ‍‍‍	19	–	8	.704	33	–	12	.733
San Francisco ‍‍‍	16	–	11	.593	25	–	28	.472
BYU ‍‍‍	15	–	12	.556	23	–	27	.460
Portland ‍‍‍	14	–	13	.519	24	–	26	.480
Loyola Marymount ‍‍‍	13	–	14	.481	20	–	29	.408
Pepperdine ‍‍‍	12	–	15	.444	20	–	25	.444
Saint Mary's ‍‍‍	11	–	16	.407	25	–	26	.490
Santa Clara ‍‍‍	8	–	19	.296	18	–	33	.353
Pacific ‍‍‍	7	–	20	.259	17	–	34	.333
† – Conference champion y – Invited to the NCAA tournament As of June 6, 2021; Rankings from D1Baseball

The 2021 BYU Cougars baseball team represented Brigham Young University during the 2021 NCAA Division I baseball season. Mike Littlewood acted as head coach of the Cougars for a ninth consecutive season. The Cougars were picked to finish fourth in the WCC Pre-season poll. The Cougars entered the season after having watched the WCC cancel the 2020 season due to the COVID-19 pandemic. As a cost containment measure, the WCC cut the 2021 baseball tournament, so the regular season champion will got the conferences auto-bid to the NCAA Tournament. The Cougars went 23–27 overall, 15–12 in conference, and finished fourth in the standings.

== 2021 Roster ==
2021 BYU Cougars roster
Pitchers: 4 Andrew Pintar – Sophomore; 6 Mitch McIntyre – Senior; 7 Cooper Vest – Freshman; 9 Easton Walker – Senior; 13 Cy Nielson – Sophomore; 19 Bryce Robison – Sophomore; 21 Jack Sterner – (redshirt) Sophomore; 23 Peyton Cole – Sophomore; 24 Drew Zimmerman – Senior; 25 Austin Deming – Junior; 26 Carter Smith – Sophomore; 28 Trystan Plunkett – Sophomore; 31 Reid McLaughlin – Junior; 32 Tyson Heaton – Sophomore; 36 Luke Sterner – Freshman; 37 Cooper McKeehan – Sophomore; 39 Mikade Johnson – Sophomore; 40 Ayden Callahan – Junior; 42 Boston Mabeus – Freshman	Infielders: 2 Brock Watson – Sophomore; 4 Andrew Pintar – Sophomore; 8 Bryan Call – Junior; 14 Bitner Workman – Freshman; 16 Jacob Rogers – Junior; 23 Peyton Call – Sophomore; 25 Austin Deming – Junior; 29 Sean Rimmer – Sophomore; 35 Jacob Wilk- Junior; 45 Freddy Achecar – Senior	Catchers: 11 Abraham Valdez – Senior; 17 Joshua Cowden – Junior; 34 Joshua Youngblood – Sophomore; 38 JD Gardner – Freshman; 44 Chase Taylor – Sophomore; Outfielders: 3 Danny Gelalich – Senior; 5 Hunter Swapp – Sophomore; 6 Mitch McIntyre – Senior; 7 Cooper Vest – Freshman; 10 Hayden Leatham – Senior; 22 Cole Gambill – Junior; 27 Ryan Sepede – Sophomore; 28 Trystan Plunkett – Sophomore; 29 Sean Rimmer – Sophomore

== Schedule ==
2021 BYU Cougars Game Log
Regular season
February

Date	Opponent	Rank	Site/stadium	Television	Score	Win	Loss	Save	Attendance	Overall record	WCC record
February 20	at Texas State	–	Bobcat Ballpark	ESPN+	4–5	Austin Smith (1–0)	Easton Walker (0–1)	Tristan Stivors (1)	165	0–1	–
February 20	at Texas State	–	Bobcat Ballpark	ESPN+	9–4	Bryce Robison (1–0)	Trevis Sundgren (0–1)	Reid McLaughlin (1)	151	1–1	–
February 22	at Texas State	–	Bobcat Ballpark	Facebook	6–11	Austin Smith (2–0)	Boston Mabeus (0–1)	None	700	1–2	–
February 23	at Texas State	–	Bobcat Ballpark	ESPN+	7–6^{(10)}	Mitch McIntyre (1–0)	Tristan Stivors (0–1)	None	700	2–2	–
February 24	at #19 Texas	–	UFCU Disch-Falk Field	LHN	1–3	Cole Quintanilla (1–0)	Boston Mabeus (0–2)	Tanner Witt (1)	1,474	2–3	–
February 25	at #19 Texas	–	UFCU Disch-Falk Field	LHN	6–12	Palmer Wenzel (1–0)	Bryce Robison (1–1)	None	1,424	2–4	–
February 26	at #19 Texas	–	UFCU Disch-Falk Field	LHN	1–11	Ty Madden (1–1)	Cy Nielson (0–1)	None	1,504	2–5	–
February 27	at #19 Texas	–	UFCU Disch-Falk Field	LHN	5–4	Reid McLaughlin (1–0)	Caden Noah (0–1)	Mitch McIntyre (1)	1,524	3–5	–

March

Date	Opponent	Rank	Site/stadium	Television	Score	Win	Loss	Save	Attendance	Overall record	WCC record
March 4	at Oregon State	–	Goss Stadium at Coleman Field	P12+ OSU	0–1	Reid Sebby (2–0)	Mikade Johnson (0–1)	Jake Mulholland (2)	0	3–6	–
March 5	at Oregon State	–	Goss Stadium at Coleman Field	P12+ OSU	3–5	Joey Mundt (1–0)	Carter Smith (0–1)	Nathan Burns (1)	0	3–7	–
March 6	at Oregon State	–	Goss Stadium at Coleman Field	P12+ OSU	3–4	Jake Mulholland (1–0)	Tyson Heaton (0–1)	None	0	3–8	–
March 11	at Utah	–	Smith's Ballpark	P12+ UT	3–6	Matthew Sox (2–0)	Mikade Johnson (0–2)	None	0	3–9	–
March 12	at Utah	–	Smith's Ballpark	P12+ UT	1–7	Kyle Robeniol (1–1)	Cy Nielson (0–2)	None	0	3–10	–
March 13	Utah	–	Larry H. Miller Field	BYUtv	Cancelled- Snowstorm						
March 16	at Dixie State	–	Bruce Hurst Field	WAC DN	4–5	Brayden Bonner (1–0)	Mikade Johnson (0–3)	None	721	3–11	–
March 18	at Loyola Marymount*	–	George C. Page Stadium	WCC Net	5–4	Easton Walker (1–1)	CJ Fernandezees (1–1)	Reid McLaughlin (2)	0	4–11	1–0
March 19	at Loyola Marymount*	–	George C. Page Stadium		9–2	Boston Mabeus (1–2)	Jimmy Galicia (1–4)	None	0	5–11	2–0
March 20	at Loyola Marymount*	–	George C. Page Stadium		4–1	Cy Nielson (1–2)	Holden Chtistian (0–1)	Bryce Robison (1)	0	6–11	3–0
March 23	Utah Valley	–	Larry H. Miller Field	BYUtv.org	11–7	Boston Mabeus (2–2)	Jaxson Otis (0–2)	Bryce Robison (2)	495	7–11	–
March 25	San Francisco*	–	Larry H. Miller Field	BYUtv.org	8–7^{(10)}	Bryce Robison (2–1)	Max Jones (0–1)	None	492	8–11	4–0
March 26	San Francisco*	–	Larry H. Miller Field	BYUtv.org	6–10^{(10)}	Jesse Barron (1–2)	Mitch McIntyre (1–1)	None	798	8–12	4–1
March 27	San Francisco*	–	Larry H. Miller Field	BYUtv.org	1–3	Eric Reyzelman (1–1)	Jack Sterner (0–1)	Jesse Barron (3)	799	8–13	4–2

April

Date	Opponent	Rank	Site/stadium	Television	Score	Win	Loss	Save	Attendance	Overall record	WCC record
April 1	at Santa Clara*	–	Stephen Schott Stadium	WCC Net	0–5	Nick Sando (1–1)	Easton Walker (1–2)	Alex Reelfs (1)	0	8–14	4–3
April 2	at Santa Clara*	–	Stephen Schott Stadium	WCC Net	3–11	Brandon Buckley (2–1)	Carter Smith (0–2)	Jared Feikes (1)	0	8–15	4–4
April 3	at Santa Clara*	–	Stephen Schott Stadium	WCC Net	3–1	Bryce Robison (3–1)	Cole Kitchen (5–1)	None	0	9–15	5–4
April 8	Portland*	–	Larry H. Miller Field	BYUtv.org	3–5	Caleb Franzen (1–2)	Bryce Robison (3–2)	Eli Morse (8)	492	9–16	5–5
April 9	Portland*	–	Larry H. Miller Field	BYUtv	1–0	Reid McLaughlin (2–1)	Eli Morse (0–1)	None	487	10–16	6–5
April 10	Portland*	–	Larry H. Miller Field	BYUtv	6–7	Eli Morse (1–1)	Carter Smith (0–3)	None	496	10–17	6–6
April 13	Utah	–	Larry H. Miller Field	BYUtv.org	7–4	Bryce Robison (4–2)	Dustyn Schramm (0–2)	Reid McLaughlin (3)	742	11–17	–
April 15	at Omaha	–	Tal Anderson Field	Mavs All-Access	1–2	Joey Machado (3–3)	Easton Walker (1–3)	Tanner Howe (1)	361	11–18	–
April 16	at Omaha	–	Tal Anderson Field	NET	5–6	Josiah Scott (3–1)	Reid McLaughlin (2–1)	None	322	11–19	–
April 17	at Omaha	–	Tal Anderson Field	Mavs All-Access	1–4	Mark Timmins (3–2)	Carter Smith (0–4)	None	533	11–20	–
April 20	Dixie State	–	Larry H. Miller Field	BYUtv.org	3–2	Cy Nielson (2–2)	Haiden Hendricks (0–1)	Reid McLaughlin (4)	493	12–20	–
April 22	at Gonzaga*	–	Patterson Baseball Complex	WCC Net	1–12	Alek Jacob (4–1)	Easton Walker (1–4)	None	250	12–21	6–7
April 23	at Gonzaga*	–	Patterson Baseball Complex	WCC Net	1–2	Gabriel Hughes (3–2)	Jack Sterner (0–2)	Brody Jessee (3)	400	12–22	6–8
April 24	at Gonzaga*	–	Patterson Baseball Complex	SWX	3–7	Michael Spellacy (3–2)	Boston Mabeus (3–3)	Trystan Vrieling (1)	150	12–23	6–9
April 27	#26 Arizona State	–	Larry H. Miller Field	BYUtv.org	8–5	Bryce Robison (5–2)	Jared Glenn (4–1)	Reid McLaughlin (5)	422	13–23	–
April 29	Saint Mary's*	–	Larry H. Miller Field	BYUtv.org	12–0	Easton Walker (2–4)	Ryan Taurek (2–2)	None	497	14–23	7–9
April 30	Saint Mary's*	–	Larry H. Miller Field	BYUtv	4–2	Cooper McKeehan (1–0)	Sam Bower (4–4)	Reid McLaughlin (6)	492	15–23	8–9

May

Date	Opponent	Rank	Site/stadium	Television	Score	Win	Loss	Save	Attendance	Overall record	WCC record
May 1	Saint Mary's*	–	Larry H. Miller Field	BYUtv	4–3	Bryce Robison (6–2)	Ky Bush (5–4)	Cooper McKeehan (1–0)	496	16–23	9–9
May 4	at Utah Valley	–	UCCU Ballpark	WAC DN	11–4	Cy Nielson (3–2)	Devin Smith (0–3)	None	2,053	17–23	–
May 6	at San Diego*	–	Fowler Park	WCC Net	6–4 ^{(10)}	Reid McLaughlin (3–1)	Ryan Robinson (2–1)	None	100	18–23	10–9
May 7	at San Diego*	–	Fowler Park	WCC Net	11–10	Cooper McKeehan (2–0)	Conner Thurman (5–3)	Carter Smith (1)	100	19–23	11–9
May 8	at San Diego*	–	Fowler Park	WCC Net	12–13	Brycen Mautz (3–1)	Easton Walker (2–5)	None	100	19–24	11–10
May 13	at Pacific*	–	Klein Family Field	WCC Net	3–6	Joe Solomon (1–1)	Cooper McKeehan (2–1)	Zach Patterson (3)	60	19–25	11–11
May 14	at Pacific*	–	Klein Family Field	WCC Net	5–0	Jack Sterner (1–2)	Hayden Pearce (3–7)	Carter Smith (2)	80	20–25	12–11
May 15	at Pacific*	–	Klein Family Field	WCC Net	6–0	Bryce Robison (7–2)	Hunter Schilperoort (1–2)	None	100	21–25	13–11
May 18	Utah	–	Larry H. Miller Field	BYUtv.org	5–11	Randon Hostert (3–0)	Cy Nielson (3–3)	None	494	21–26	–
May 20	Pepperdine*	–	Larry H. Miller Field	BYUtv.org	3–6	Brandon Llewellyn (4–1)	Easton Walker (2–6)	Trevor Hinkel (1)	492	21–27	13–12
May 21	Pepperdine*	–	Larry H. Miller Field	BYUtv.org	14–5	Carter Smith (1–4)	Shane Telfer (2–1)	None	490	22–27	14–12
May 22	Pepperdine*	–	Larry H. Miller Field	BYUtv.org	14–7	Drew Zimmerman (1–0)	Nathan Diamond (2–4)	None	500	23–27	15–12

Rankings from Collegiate Baseball. Parenthesis indicate tournament seedings.
*West Coast Conference games

== Rivalries ==
BYU had two main rivalries on their schedule, the Deseret First Duel vs. Utah and the UCCU Crosstown Clash vs. Utah Valley. New D1 state team Dixie State also played the Cougars.

== Radio Information ==
BYU Baseball was once again broadcast as part of the NuSkin BYU Sports Network. BYU Radio 107.9 KUMT served as the flagship station. However, because of a women's soccer and general conference conflicts, some radio broadcasts were App exclusives, and the first three games against Texas State didn't have a radio broadcast. Jason Shepherd and Greg Wrubell rotated providing play-by-play after Brent Norton retired from the position after 30 seasons. Tuckett Slade served as analyst on most broadcasts.

== TV Announcers ==
- Texas State: Brant Freeman & Ty Harrington
- Texas State: Brant Freeman & Ty Harrington
- Texas State: Tuckett Slade
- Texas State: Brant Freeman & Ty Harrington
- Texas: Keith Moreland & Greg Swindell
- Texas: Keith Moreland & Greg Swindell
- Texas: Keith Moreland & Greg Swindell
- Texas: Keith Moreland & Greg Swindell
- Oregon State: Mike Parker
- Oregon State: Mike Parker
- Oregon State: Mike Parker
- Utah: Brian Preece & Mike Lageschulte
- Utah: Brian Preece & Scott Stephens
- Dixie State: No commentary
- Loyola Marymount: Nick Koop & Aidan Buzo
- Utah Valley: Spencer Linton, Gary Sheide, & Jason Shepherd
- San Francisco: Spencer Linton, Gary Sheide, & Jason Shepherd
- San Francisco: Spencer Linton & Jason Shepherd
- San Francisco: Dave McCann & Gary Sheide
- Santa Clara: Joe Ritzo
- Santa Clara: Daniel Barrera
- Santa Clara: Anthony Passarelli
- Portland: Spencer Linton & Gary Sheide
- Portland: Spencer Linton & Gary Sheide
- Portland: Dave McCann & Gary Sheide
- Utah: Spencer Linton, Gary Sheide, & Jason Shepherd
- Omaha: Jack McGonigal & Joey Colbert
- Omaha: Larry Punteney & Jeff Leise
- Omaha: Ana Bellinghausen, Avarie Howard, & Alexa Blase
- Dixie State: Spencer Linton, Gary Sheide, & Jason Shepherd
- Gonzaga: Greg Talbott
- Gonzaga: Greg Talbott
- Gonzaga: Dave Cotton & Billy Moon
- Arizona State: Jason Shepherd & Gary Sheide
- Saint Mary's: Spencer Linton & Gary Sheide
- Saint Mary's: Spencer Linton & Gary Sheide
- Saint Mary's: Dave McCann & Gary Sheide
- Utah Valley: Jordan Bianucci & Ryan Pickens
- San Diego: Jack Murray
- San Diego: Jack Murray
- San Diego: Jack Murray
- Pacific: Jeff Dominick
- Pacific: Dennis Ackerman
- Pacific: Dennis Ackerman
- Utah: Dave McCann, Gary Sheide, & Jason Shepherd
- Pepperdine: Spencer Linton, Gary Sheide, & Jason Shepherd
- Pepperdine: Spencer Linton, Gary Sheide, & Jason Shepherd
- Pepperdine: Dave McCann, Gary Sheide, & Jason Shepherd
