= 2020 BYU Cougars baseball team =

American college baseball season

2020 BYU Cougars baseball
- Conference: West Coast Conference
- Record: 7-9 (0-0 WCC)
- Head coach: Mike Littlewood (8th season)
- Assistant coaches: Trent Pratt (8th season); Brent Haring (8th season); Michael Bradshaw (2nd season)
- Home stadium: Larry H. Miller Field

2020 West Coast Conference baseball standings
	Conf.				Overall
Team	W		L	PCT	W		L	PCT
San Francisco ‍‍‍	1	–	0	1.000	10	–	8	.556
San Diego ‍‍‍	2	–	1	.667	13	–	5	.722
Loyola Marymount ‍‍‍	2	–	1	.667	10	–	9	.526
Portland ‍‍‍	1	–	1	.500	13	–	5	.722
Pacific ‍‍‍	3	–	6	.333	12	–	14	.462
No. 21 Pepperdine ‍‍‍	0	–	0	–	12	–	3	.800
Santa Clara ‍‍‍	0	–	0	–	12	–	5	.706
Saint Mary's ‍‍‍	0	–	0	–	8	–	8	.500
BYU ‍‍‍	0	–	0	–	7	–	9	.438
Gonzaga ‍‍‍	0	–	0	–	6	–	10	.375
‡ – Tournament champion As of March 12, 2020; Rankings from D1Baseball

The 2020 BYU Cougars baseball team represented Brigham Young University during the 2020 NCAA Division I baseball season. Mike Littlewood acted as head coach of the Cougars for an eighth consecutive season. The Cougars were picked to finish second in the WCC Pre-season poll. However they secured more first place votes from the WCC Media than any team with 5 and were named the team to beat by Baseball America. The Cougars never got to play in conference though as all athletic events were shut down by the school March 12 due to COVID-19.

== 2020 Roster ==
2019 BYU Cougars roster
Pitchers: 4 Andrew Pintar - Freshman; 6 Mitch McIntyre - Junior; 9 Easton Walker - Junior; 13 Cy Nielson - Freshman; 14 Chase Bauerle - Junior; 18 Justin Sterner - Junior; 19 Bryce Robinson - Freshman; 21 Jack Sterner - (redshirt) Freshman; 22 Jarod Lessar - Senior; 24 Drew Zimmerman - Junior; 25 Austin Deming - Sophomore; 26 Carter Smith - Freshman; 31 Reid McLaughlin - Sophomore; 32 Tyson Heaton - Freshman; 34 Cutter Clawson - Freshman; 37 Cooper McKeehan - Freshman; 39 Mikade Johnson - Freshman; 40 Ayden Callahan - Junior; 45 Ben Weese - Senior	Infielders: 2 Brock Watson - Freshman; 4 Andrew Pintar - Freshman; 8 Bryan Call - Sophomore; 16 Jacob Rogers - Sophomore; 23 Peyton Call - Freshman; 25 Austin Deming - Sophomore; 28 Zack Peterson - Sophomore; 29 Sean Rimmer - Freshman; 41 Russell Parry - Freshman	Catchers: 11 Abraham Valdez - Senior; 17 Joshua Cowden - Sophomore; 44 Chase Taylor - Freshman; Outfielders: 3 Danny Gelalich - Junior; 5 Hunter Swapp - Freshman; 6 Mitch McIntyre - Junior; 7 Hobbs Nyberg - Sophomore; 10 Hayden Leatham - Junior; 12 McKay Barney - Freshman; 27 Ryan Sepede - Sophomore; 29 Sean Rimmer - Freshman; 43 Jaren Hall - Sophomore

== Schedule ==
2020 BYU Cougars Game Log
Regular season
February

Date	Opponent	Rank	Site/stadium	Television	Score	Win	Loss	Save	Attendance	Overall record	WCC record
February 14	vs. Gonzaga	–	Surprise Stadium	FloBaseball	7–1	Reid McLaughlin (1–0)	Daniel Naughton (0–1)	None	635	1–0	–
February 15	vs. New Mexico	–	Surprise Stadium	FloBaseball	0–2	Aaron Makil (1–0)	Cy Neilson (0–1)	None	741	1–1	–
February 15	vs. New Mexico	–	Surprise Stadium Auxiliary	Facebook	4–5	Will Armbruester (1–0)	Carter Smith (0–1)	Miguel Reyes Jr. (1)	311	1–2	–
February 17	vs. #25 Oregon State	–	Surprise Stadium	FloBaseball	4–3	Drew Zimmerman (1–0)	Joey Mundt (0–1)	Mikade Johnson (1)	2,598	2–2	–
February 20	at Cal Poly	–	Baggett Stadium	Big West TV	3–2	Justin Sterner (1–0)	Taylor Dollard (1–1)	None	1,523	3–2	–
February 21	at Cal Poly	–	Baggett Stadium	Big West TV	4–3	Bryce Robinson (1–0)	Kyle Scott (0–1)	None	1,598	4–2	–
February 22	at Cal Poly	–	Baggett Stadium	Big West TV	0–10	Drew Thorpe (1–0)	Easton Walker (0–1)	None	1,668	4–3	–
February 22	at Cal Poly	–	Baggett Stadium	Big West TV	5–4^{(14)}	Tyson Heaton (1–0)	Bryan Woo (0–1)	None	1,668	5–3	–
February 27	at New Mexico	–	Santa Ana Star Field	MW Net	7–8	Payton Strambler (1–1)	Reid McLaughlin (2–1)	None	751	5–4	–
February 28	at New Mexico	–	Santa Ana Star Field	MW Net	0–4	Justin Armbruster (1-0)	Cy Nelson (0–2)	Terrell Hudson (1)	789	5–5	–
February 28	at New Mexico	–	Santa Ana Star Field	MW Net	18–9	Tyson Heaton (2–0)	Cody Dye (0–2)	None	789	6–5	–
February 29	at New Mexico	–	Santa Ana Star Field	MW Net	1–12	Nathaniel Garley (1–0)	Easton Walker (0–2)	None	826	6–5	–

March

Date	Opponent	Rank	Site/stadium	Television	Score	Win	Loss	Save	Attendance	Overall record	WCC record
March 3	Utah Valley	–	Larry H. Miller Field	BYUtv.org	5–4	Cooper McKeehan (1–0)	Bobby Voortmeyer (0–2)	Reid McLaughlin (1)	1,640	7–6	–
March 5	at Oklahoma State	–	Allie P. Reynolds Stadium	ESPN+	0–2	Scott Parker (3–1)	Cooper McKeehan (1–1)	None	382	7–7	–
March 6	at Oklahoma State	–	Allie P. Reynolds Stadium	ESPN+	1–6	Justin Campbell (1–2)	Cy Nielson (0–3)	None	672	7–8	–
March 7	at Oklahoma State	–	Allie P. Reynolds Stadium		3–8	Bryce Osmond (1–1)	Reid McLaughlin (2–2)	None	1,320	7–9	–
March 12	Loyola Marymount*	–	Larry H. Miller Field	BYUtv.org	Cancelled- COVID-19						
March 13	Loyola Marymount*	–	Larry H. Miller Field	BYUtv	Cancelled- COVID-19						
March 14	Loyola Marymount*	–	Larry H. Miller Field	BYUtv	Cancelled- COVID-19						
March 19	at Pepperdine*	–	Eddy D. Field Stadium	WCC Network	Cancelled- COVID-19						
March 20	at Pepperdine*	–	Eddy D. Field Stadium	WCC Network	Cancelled- COVID-19						
March 21	at Pepperdine*	–	Eddy D. Field Stadium	WCC Network	Cancelled- COVID-19						
March 24	Utah	–	Larry H. Miller Field	BYUtv.org	Cancelled- COVID-19						
March 26	Santa Clara*	–	Larry H. Miller Field	BYUtv.org	Cancelled- COVID-19						
March 27	Santa Clara*	–	Larry H. Miller Field	BYUtv	Cancelled- COVID-19						
March 28	Santa Clara*	–	Larry H. Miller Field	BYUtv	Cancelled- COVID-19						
March 30	at Boise State	–	Memorial Stadium	MW Net	Cancelled- COVID-19						

April

Date	Opponent	Rank	Site/stadium	Television	Score	Win	Loss	Save	Attendance	Overall record	WCC record
April 2	at Portland*	–	Joe Etzel Field	WCC Network	Cancelled- COVID-19						
April 3	at Portland*	–	Joe Etzel Field	WCC Network	Cancelled- COVID-19						
April 4	at Portland*	–	Joe Etzel Field	WCC Network	Cancelled- COVID-19						
April 6	at Oregon	–	PK Park	P12+ ORE	Cancelled- COVID-19						
April 9	Pacific*	–	Larry H. Miller Field	BYUtv.org	Cancelled- COVID-19						
April 10	Pacific*	–	Larry H. Miller Field	BYUtv.org	Cancelled- COVID-19						
April 11	Pacific*	–	Larry H. Miller Field	BYUtv	Cancelled- COVID-19						
April 13	Boise State	–	Larry H. Miller Field	BYUtv	Cancelled- COVID-19						
April 16	San Diego*	–	Larry H. Miller Field	BYUtv.org	Cancelled- COVID-19						
April 17	San Diego*	–	Larry H. Miller Field	BYUtv	Cancelled- COVID-19						
April 18	San Diego*	–	Larry H. Miller Field	BYUtv	Cancelled- COVID-19						
April 21	Utah	–	Larry H. Miller Field	BYUtv.org	Cancelled- COVID-19						
April 22	at Utah Valley	–	UCCU Ballpark	WAC DN	Cancelled- COVID-19						
April 30	at San Francisco*	–	Dante Benedetti Diamond at Max Ulrich Field	WCC Network	Cancelled- COVID-19						

May

Date	Opponent	Rank	Site/stadium	Television	Score	Win	Loss	Save	Attendance	Overall record	WCC record
May 1	at San Francisco*		Dante Benedetti Diamond at Max Ulrich Field	WCC Network	Cancelled- COVID-19						
May 2	at San Francisco*	–	Dante Benedetti Diamond at Max Ulrich Field	WCC Network	Cancelled- COVID-19						
May 4	Cal Baptist	–	Larry H. Miller Field	BYUtv	Cancelled- COVID-19						
May 7	at Saint Mary's*	–	Louis Guisto Field	WCC Network	Cancelled- COVID-19						
May 8	at Saint Mary's*	–	Louis Guisto Field	WCC Network	Cancelled- COVID-19						
May 9	at Saint Mary's*	–	Louis Guisto Field	WCC Network	Cancelled- COVID-19						
May 12	at Utah	–	Smith's Ballpark	P12	Cancelled- COVID-19						
May 14	at Gonzaga*	–	Washington Trust Field and Patterson Baseball Complex	ESPNU	Cancelled- COVID-19						
May 15	at Gonzaga*	–	Washington Trust Field and Patterson Baseball Complex	WCC Network	Cancelled- COVID-19						
May 16	at Gonzaga*	–	Washington Trust Field and Patterson Baseball Complex	WCC Network	Cancelled- COVID-19						

2020 West Coast Conference Baseball Tournament
May

Date	Opponent	Rank	Site/stadium	Television	Score	Win	Loss	Save	Attendance	Overall record	WCC record
May 21–23		–	Banner Island Ballpark	WCC Network	Cancelled- COVID-19						

Rankings from Collegiate Baseball. Parenthesis indicate tournament seedings.
*West Coast Conference games

== Rivalries ==
BYU had two main rivalries on their schedule- the Deseret First Duel vs. Utah and the UCCU Crosstown Clash vs. Utah Valley. The first game against UVU was played, but the remaining 3 rivalry games were cancelled because of COVID-19.

== Radio Information ==
For the third consecutive season BYU Baseball was broadcast as part of the NuSkin BYU Sports Network, and for the second time ever every BYU Baseball game was broadcast on radio. Brent Norton was scheduled to provide play-by-play for his 28th consecutive season beginning with conference play, but when all games beginning March 12 were canceled it was Jason Shepherd who had called every game. Tuckett Slade provided analysis for all but 1 games. Games were carried on KOVO and KUMT. KOVO had 3 exclusives (Gm. 1 Feb. 15, Gm. 2 Feb. 22, and Gm. 2 Feb. 28), while BYU Radio's KUMT had 4 exclusives (Gm. 2 Feb. 15, Feb. 20, Gm. 1 Feb. 22, and Mar. 7). All games were carried live on the BYU Sports Radio App and are archived on BYU Radio.

== TV Announcers ==
- Feb 14: Zachary Anderson-Yoxsimer
- Feb 15 (1): Zachary Anderson-Yoxsimer
- Feb 15 (2): Jason Shepherd & Brock Hale
- Feb 17: Zachary Anderson-Yoxsimer
- Feb 20: Zachary Anderson-Yoxsimer
- Feb 21: Chris Sylvester
- Feb 22 (1): Chris Sylvester
- Feb 22 (2): Zachary Anderson-Yoxsimer
- Feb 27: Robert Portnoy
- Feb 28 (1): Robert Portnoy
- Feb 28 (2): Robert Portnoy
- Feb 29: Robert Portnoy
- Mar 3: Spencer Linton & Gary Sheide
- Mar 5: Dave Hunziker & Tom Holliday
- Mar 6: Dave Hunziker & Tom Holliday
