= 2013 West Coast Conference baseball tournament =

- 2013 WCC Tournament logo
- Teams: 4
- Format: Double-elimination
- Finals site: Banner Island Ballpark; Stockton, CA
- Champions: San Diego (7th title)
- Winning coach: Rich Hill (7th title)
- MVP: Troy Conyers (San Diego)
- Television: Preliminaries: WCC Network; Championship: ESPNU

2013 West Coast Conference baseball standings
	Conf.						Overall
Team	W		L		T	PCT	W		L		T	PCT
Gonzaga ‍†‍‍	18	–	6	–	0	.750	32	–	21	–	1	.602
BYU ‍‍‍	15	–	9	–	0	.625	32	–	21	–	0	.604
San Francisco ‍‍‍^{y}	15	–	9	–	0	.625	37	–	25	–	0	.597
San Diego ‍‍‡‍^{y}	15	–	9	–	0	.625	35	–	24	–	0	.593
Pepperdine ‍‍‍	13	–	11	–	0	.542	27	–	23	–	0	.540
Loyola Marymount ‍‍‍	12	–	12	–	0	.500	24	–	27	–	0	.471
Saint Mary's ‍‍‍	11	–	13	–	0	.458	21	–	34	–	0	.382
Portland ‍‍‍	8	–	16	–	0	.333	18	–	36	–	0	.333
Santa Clara ‍‍‍	1	–	23	–	0	.042	14	–	39	–	0	.264
† – Conference champion ‡ – Tournament champion y – Invited to the NCAA tournament As of June 3, 2013; Rankings from Collegiate Baseball

The 2013 West Coast Conference baseball tournament was held from May 23 through 25 at Banner Island Ballpark in Stockton, California. It was the first postseason championship event sponsored by the West Coast Conference since 2009, the first such event to be held at a neutral site, and the first to feature more than two teams. In the championship game, San Diego defeated San Francisco, 2–0, to win its first tournament championship. As a result, San Diego earned the league's automatic bid to the 2013 NCAA Division I baseball tournament.

== Seeding ==
The top four finishers from the regular season were seeded one through four based on conference winning percentage. The teams then played a double elimination tournament. However, the championship was a single-elimination game.

Team	W	L	Pct.	GB	Seed
Gonzaga	18	6	.750	–	1
x- San Diego	15	9	.625	3	2
y- BYU	15	9	.625	3	3
San Francisco	15	9	.625	3	4
Pepperdine	13	11	.542	5	–
Loyola Marymount	12	12	.500	6	–
Saint Mary's	11	13	.458	7	–
Portland	8	16	.333	10	–
Santa Clara	1	23	.042	17	–

Tiebreakers:
x- USD went 3–0 vs. BYU and 2–1 vs. USF to claim the #2 seed
y- BYU went 2–1 vs. USF to claim the #3 seed.

== Results ==
Upper round 1
1	Gonzaga	5
4	San Francisco	8
2	San Diego	9
3	BYU	8
Lower round 1
1	Gonzaga	1
3	BYU	8

Upper final
4	San Francisco	10
2	San Diego	8
Lower final
2	San Diego	7
3	BYU	4

Final
4	San Francisco
2	San Diego

== Box scores ==
=== #4 San Francisco vs. #1 Gonzaga ===
Thursday, May 22 3:00 p.m. Broadcaster: WCC Network w/ Andy Masur, Keith Ramsey, & Amanda Blackwell
Team	1	2	3	4	5	6	7	8	9	R	H	E
#4 San Francisco	0	3	1	0	1	0	1	0	2	8	15	1
#1 Gonzaga	0	0	4	0	0	0	1	0	0	5	8	2
WP: Haden Hinkle (9–1) LP: Marco Gonzales (7–3) Sv: Adam Simber (9); Home runs: USF: Bob Mott (2); ZAGS: Cory Lebrun (2); Attendance: 664; Notes: Duration: 3:24; Weather: 73 °F (23 °C), Sunny, winds 9mph to left Boxscore

=== #3 BYU vs. #2 San Diego ===
Thursday, May 22 7:30 p.m. Broadcaster: WCC Network w/ Andy Masur, Keith Ramsey, & Amanda Blackwell
Team	1	2	3	4	5	6	7	8	9	10	R	H	E
#3 BYU	1	0	0	2	0	0	5	0	0	0	8	11	4
#2 San Diego	1	1	0	0	0	6	0	0	0	1	9	11	2
WP: Max Homick (5–1) LP: Matt Milke (3–2); Home runs: BYU: Bret Lopez (4); USD: Andrew Daniel (4), Dillon Haupt (11); Attendance: 838; Notes: Duration: 3:30; Weather: 72 °F (22 °C), Clear, winds 13mph to left Boxscore

=== #3 BYU vs. #1 Gonzaga ===
Friday, May 23 12:00 p.m. Broadcaster: WCC Network w/ Andy Masur, Keith Ramsey, & Amanda Blackwell
Team	1	2	3	4	5	6	7	8	9	R	H	E
#1 Gonzaga	0	0	0	0	0	1	0	0	0	1	11	0
#3 BYU	0	0	0	0	0	4	0	4	x	8	14	0
WP: Jeff Barker (6–3) LP: Tyler Olson (9–4); Home runs: ZAGS: None; BYU: None; Attendance: 707; Notes: Duration: 2:29; Weather: 70 °F (21 °C), Sunny, Slight Breeze to left Boxscore

=== #2 San Diego vs. #4 San Francisco ===
Friday, May 23 3:40 p.m. Broadcaster: WCC Network w/ Andy Masur, Keith Ramsey, & Amanda Blackwell
Team	1	2	3	4	5	6	7	8	9	R	H	E
#2 San Diego	1	0	0	0	0	5	0	0	2	8	16	1
#4 San Francisco	0	0	0	0	0	4	0	2	4	10	13	0
WP: Adam Cimber (6–3) LP: Trevor Bayless (2–4); Home runs: USD: Austin Bailey (2); USF: Derek Atkinson (2); Attendance: 814; Notes: Duration: 3:25; Weather: 78 °F (26 °C), Sunny, winds 9mph to left Boxscore

=== #3 BYU vs. #2 San Diego ===
Friday, May 23 8:10 p.m. Broadcaster: WCC Network w/ Andy Masur, Keith Ramsey, & Amanda Blackwell
Team	1	2	3	4	5	6	7	8	9	R	H	E
#2 San Diego	0	1	0	0	3	0	0	2	1	7	12	2
#3 BYU	0	0	0	0	0	0	3	1	0	4	9	2
WP: Louie Lichich (3–3) LP: Adam Miller (4–8) Sv: Max Homick (5); Home runs: USD: Kris Bryant (31); BYU: Jaycob Brugman (11); Kelton Caldwell (4); Attendance: 904; Notes: Duration: 2:44; Weather: 71 °F (22 °C), Clear, winds 13mph to left Boxscore

=== WCC Championship: #4 San Francisco vs. #2 San Diego ===
Saturday, May 24 7:00 p.m. Broadcaster: ESPNU w/ Roxy Bernstein & Mike Rooney
Team	1	2	3	4	5	6	7	8	9	R	H	E
#4 San Francisco	0	0	0	0	0	0	0	0	0	0	3	0
#2 San Diego	1	0	1	0	0	0	0	0	x	2	7	0
WP: Troy Conyers (2–2) LP: Christian Cecilio (3–3); Home runs: USF: None; USD: None; Attendance: 808; Notes: Duration: 2:15; Weather: 70 °F (21 °C), Clear, winds 15mph to left Boxscore

== All-Tournament Team ==
The following players were named to the All-Tournament Team.

Name	School	Pos
Derek Atkinson	San Francisco	OF
Austin Bailey	San Diego	2B
Jeff Barker	BYU	RHP
Jaycob Brugman	BYU	OF
Kris Bryant	San Diego	3B
Troy Conyers	San Diego	LHP
Austin Green	San Diego	C
Cory LeBrun	Gonzaga	OF
Justin Maffei	San Francisco	OF
Josh Miller	San Francisco	SS

=== Most Outstanding Player ===
Troy Conyers was named Tournament Most Outstanding Player. Conyers was a pitcher for San Diego who made his first career collegiate start in the championship game, and turned in a complete-game shutout to earn the win. He recorded nine strikeouts while allowing only two hits.
