= 2018 West Coast Conference baseball tournament =

- Teams: 4
- Format: Double-elimination
- Finals site: Banner Island Ballpark; Stockton, California
- Television: TheW.tv

2018 West Coast Conference baseball standings
	Conf.				Overall
Team	W		L	PCT	W		L	PCT
Pepperdine ‍†‍‍	17	–	10	.630	31	–	24	.564
Gonzaga ‍‍‡‍^{y}	16	–	11	.593	33	–	24	.579
San Francisco ‍‍‍	15	–	12	.556	28	–	30	.483
Loyola Marymount ‍‍‍	14	–	12	.538	25	–	30	.455
Saint Mary's ‍‍‍	14	–	13	.519	31	–	23	.574
Santa Clara ‍‍‍	12	–	15	.444	26	–	26	.500
Portland ‍‍‍	12	–	15	.444	23	–	30	.434
San Diego ‍‍‍	12	–	15	.444	23	–	32	.418
Pacific ‍‍‍	11	–	16	.407	22	–	27	.449
BYU ‍‍‍	11	–	16	.407	22	–	28	.440
† – Conference champion ‡ – Tournament champion y – Invited to the NCAA tournament As of Jun 3, 2018; Rankings from Collegiate Baseball

The 2018 West Coast Conference baseball tournament was held from May 24 through 26, 2018 at Banner Island Ballpark in Stockton, California. The four team, double-elimination tournament winner earned the league's automatic bid to the 2018 NCAA Division I baseball tournament.

== Seeding ==
The top four finishers from the regular season will be seeded one through four based on conference winning percentage. The teams will then play a double elimination tournament.

== Results ==
First round
1	Pepperdine	8
4	San Francisco	2
2	Gonzaga	13
3	Loyola Marymount	1
Lower round 1
4	San Francisco	0
3	Loyola Marymount	1

Semi-finals
1	Pepperdine	2
2	Gonzaga	4
Lower final
1	Pepperdine	7
3	Loyola Marymount	6

Finals
2	Gonzaga	17	–
1	Pepperdine	2	–
