= Alex Box Stadium, Skip Bertman Field =

Baseball park at Louisiana State University

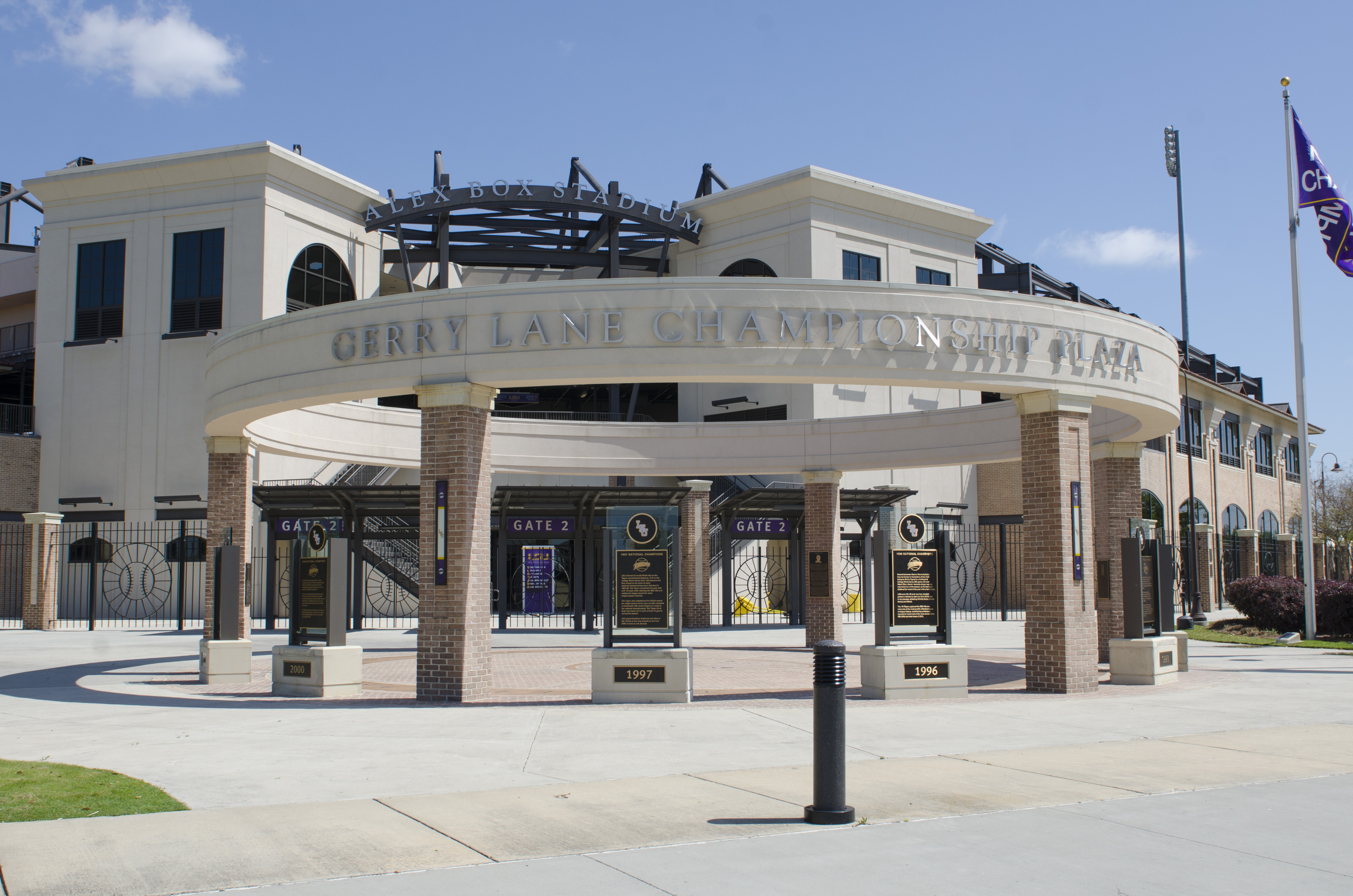
- Championship Plaza at Alex Box Stadium, Skip Bertman Field
- Interactive map of Alex Box Stadium, Skip Bertman Field
- Location: Gourrier Avenue; Baton Rouge, Louisiana 70803; United States
- Coordinates: 30.40696°N 91.18731°W
- Owner: Louisiana State University
- Operator: LSU Athletics Department
- Capacity: 10,326
- Surface: Natural grass/ Turf in foul territory
- Record attendance: 13,068 (March 30, 2023 vs. Tennessee)
- Field size: Foul lines: 330 ft Power alleys: 365 ft Center: 405 ft Height of fence: 10 ft Height of batters' eye: 40 ft

Construction
- Opened: 2009
- Architects: Grace & Hebert (architect); DLR Group (stadium design); Jeffrey L. Bruce & Company (playing field design)

Tenant
- LSU Tigers baseball (NCAA) (2009-present)

Alex Box Stadium, Skip Bertman Field is a baseball stadium in Baton Rouge, Louisiana. It is the home stadium of the Louisiana State University Tigers baseball team. The stadium section (and LSU's previous baseball stadium 200 yards to the north) were named for Simeon Alex Box, an LSU letterman (1942), Purple Heart and Distinguished Service Cross recipient, who was killed in North Africa during World War II. On May 17, 2013, prior to a game against Ole Miss, the field was named and dedicated in honor of former LSU head baseball coach and athletic director Skip Bertman.

A design team of Grace & Hebert, DLR Group, and Jeffrey L. Bruce & Company designed Alex Box Stadium, Skip Bertman Field which opened during the 2009 season. Alex Box Stadium, Skip Bertman Field was slated to hold 8,500 fans but the addition of left field seating from Alex Box Stadium brought capacity up to 9,200. Additional seating in right field was added before the 2010 season, bringing the total (official) capacity to 10,150. Construction of additional suites for the 2012 season brought the capacity to 10,326.

The first game of the new stadium was played February 20, 2009. LSU beat Villanova by a final score of 12–3 in front of a crowd totaling 9,054. Alex Box Stadium, Skip Bertman Field was named the American Sports Builders Association Facility of the Year 2009.

== Attendance ==
In 2012, college baseball writer Eric Sorenson ranked the Alex Box Stadium as the second best big game atmosphere in college baseball behind Mississippi State's Dudy Noble Field. Stadium Journey Magazine also listed Alex Box Stadium, Skip Bertman Field among the "101 Best Stadium Experiences of 2012", the only college baseball venue so honored.

=== Total and Average attendance ===
In 2013, the Tigers ranked 1st among Division I baseball programs in attendance, averaging a record 11,006 per home game.

As of the 2018 baseball season, LSU has finished No. 1 in the final college baseball total attendance rankings in 23 straight seasons. LSU posted a total attendance figure of 399,085 in 37 games.

Additionally, as of the 2018 baseball season, LSU finished No. 1 in the final average attendance rankings for the 22nd time in 23 years. (Arkansas finished No. 1 in average attendance in 2007.) In 2018, LSU averaged 10,786 tickets sold per game.

Total Attendance at Alex Box Stadium, Skip Bertman Field
Year	Games	Attendance	Average
2009	42	403,056	9,596
2010	38	404,916	10,655
2011	37	390,595	10,557
2012	44	472,391	10,736
2013	43	473,298	11,006
2014	39	424,321	10,880
2015	39	421,771	10,815
2016	41	433,783	10,580
2017	39	418,291	10,725
2018	37	399,085	10,786
2019	40	425,377	10,634
Total	439	4,666,884	10,631

=== Top paid attendance figures at Alex Box Stadium, Skip Bertman Field ===
Top 20 Paid† Attendance Figures at Alex Box Stadium, Skip Bertman Field.
Rank	Attendance	Opponent	Date	Winner, Score
1.	12,844	Notre Dame	Feb. 16, 2018	LSU, 7-6
2.	12,727 †	South Carolina	Apr. 27, 2013	USC, 4-2
3.	12,472	New Orleans	Feb. 14, 2014	LSU, 2-0
4.	12,373	Maryland	Feb. 15, 2013	LSU, 1-0
5.	12,313	Alabama	Apr. 17, 2010	LSU, 9-7
6.	12,223	Notre Dame	Feb. 17, 2018	ND, 10-5
7.	12,193	Ole Miss	May 17, 2013	LSU, 5-4
8.	12,164	Ole Miss	Mar. 14, 2015	OM, 5-3
9.	12,153 ††	Oklahoma	Jun. 8, 2013	LSU, 11-1
10.	12,085	Sam Houston St.	Jun. 1, 2013	LSU, 8-5
11.	12,076	Florida	Mar. 18, 2011	UF, 5-4
12.	12,070	Wake Forest	Feb. 18, 2011	LSU, 15-4
13.	12,042	Texas A&M	Apr. 24, 2015	LSU, 9-6
14.	12,038	Texas	Feb. 24, 2018	LSU, 10-5
15.	12,007	Oklahoma	Jun. 7, 2013	LSU, 2-0
16.	11,976	Stony Brook	Jun. 10, 2012	SB, 7-2
17.	11,906	Cincinnati	Feb. 19, 2016	LSU, 6-5
18.	11,838	Louisiana	Jun. 2, 2013	LSU, 5-1
19.	11,836	Mississippi St.	Jun. 10, 2017	LSU, 4-3
20.	11,827	Arkansas	Apr. 8, 2017	LSU, 10-8
† The regular-season record for actual attendance is 10,246 set April 27, 2013, against South Carolina (L, 4-2). †† The LSU record for actual attendance at Alex Box Stadium, Skip Bertman Field is 11,401, which was set June 8, 2013, in the NCAA Super Regional game 2 against Oklahoma (W, 11-1).

== Tournaments Hosted ==
NCAA Regional Tournaments : 2009, 2012, 2013, 2014, 2015, 2016, 2017, 2019, 2023, 2025
NCAA Super Regional Series : 2009, 2012, 2013, 2015, 2016, 2017, 2019, 2023, 2025

== LSU Record at Alex Box Stadium, Skip Bertman Field ==
2009–Present
Year	Games	W-L-T	Win Percentage
2009	42	33–9	.786
2010	38	30–8	.790
2011	37	28–9	.757
2012	44	35–9	.796
2013	43	39–4	.907
2014	39	31–7–1	.808
2015	39	33–6	.846
2016	41	28–13	.683
2017	39	32–7	.821
2018	37	29–8	.784
2019	40	30–10	.750
2020	13	11–2	.846
2021	38	24–14	.631
2022	35	26–9	.742
2023	40	33–7	.825
2024	36	27–9	.750
2025	41	35–6	.853
Totals	601	504-137-1	.786

== Alex Box Stadium, Skip Bertman Field v. Alex Box Stadium ==
Alex Box Stadium, Skip Bertman Field v. Alex Box Stadium
Alex Box Stadium, Skip Bertman Field	Section	Alex Box Stadium
10,326	Seating	7,760
3,878	Grandstand (Under Roof)	2,800
6,272	Bleachers	4,522
9,274 sq ft (861.6 m^{2})	Restrooms	2,000 sq ft (190 m^{2})
5,000 sq ft (460 m^{2})	Concessions	2,200 sq ft (200 m^{2})
500 sq ft (46 m^{2})	Arcade	N/A
8,588 sq ft (797.9 m^{2})	Suites	N/A
1,800 sq ft (170 m^{2})	Club Lounge	N/A
9,380 sq ft (871 m^{2})	Team Area	3,000 sq ft (280 m^{2})
2,000 sq ft (190 m^{2})	Press Area	250 sq ft (23 m^{2})

== Marucci Performance Center ==
The LSU Baseball Marucci Performance Center and Worley Family Hitting Facility are located behind the right-field wall of the stadium. The performance center is a 4,300 square-foot structure that includes a weight room for the baseball team.

== Gallery ==
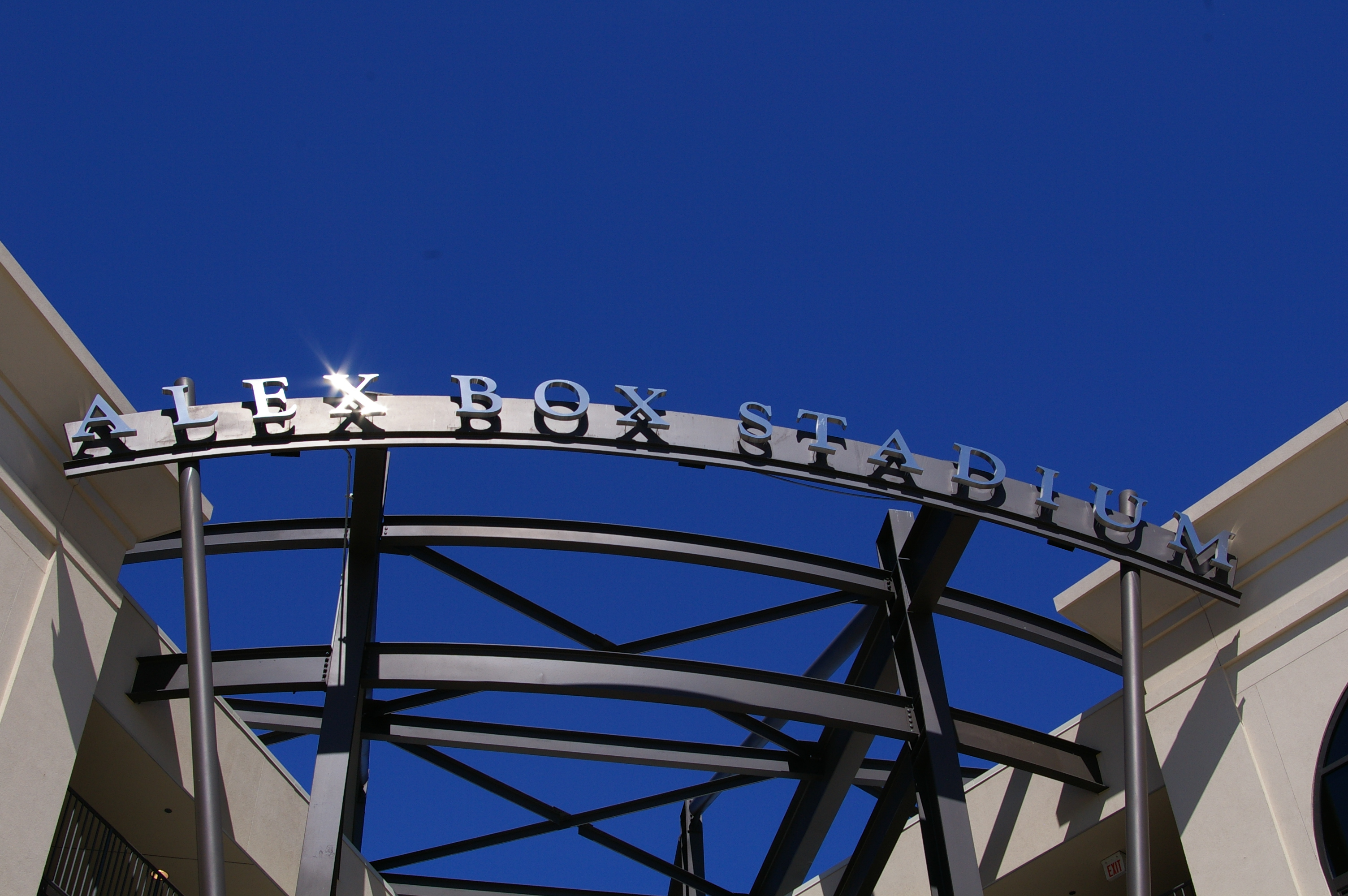
Alex Box Stadium, Skip Bertman Field - Marquee

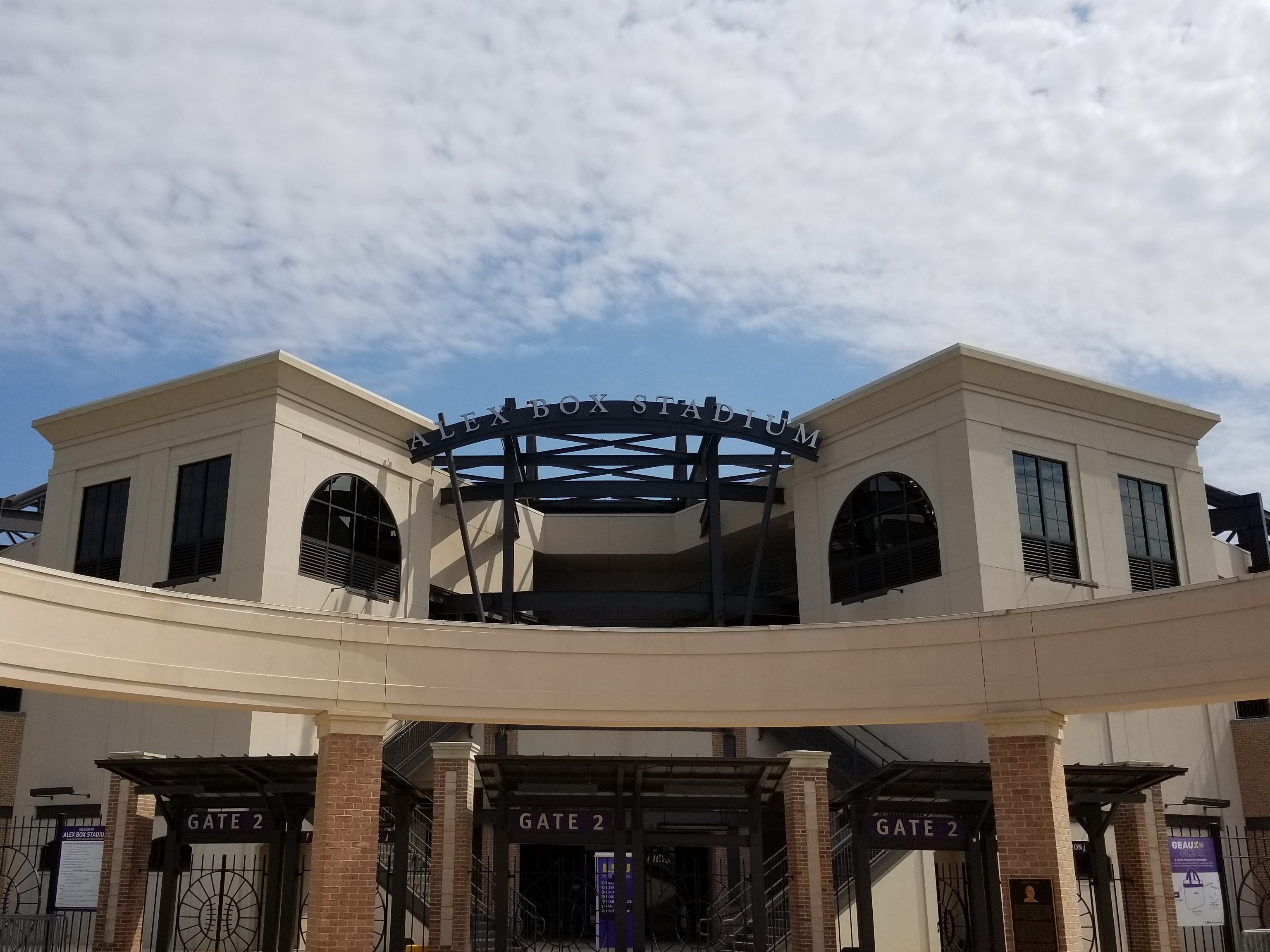
Alex Box Stadium, Skip Bertman Field - Main entrance

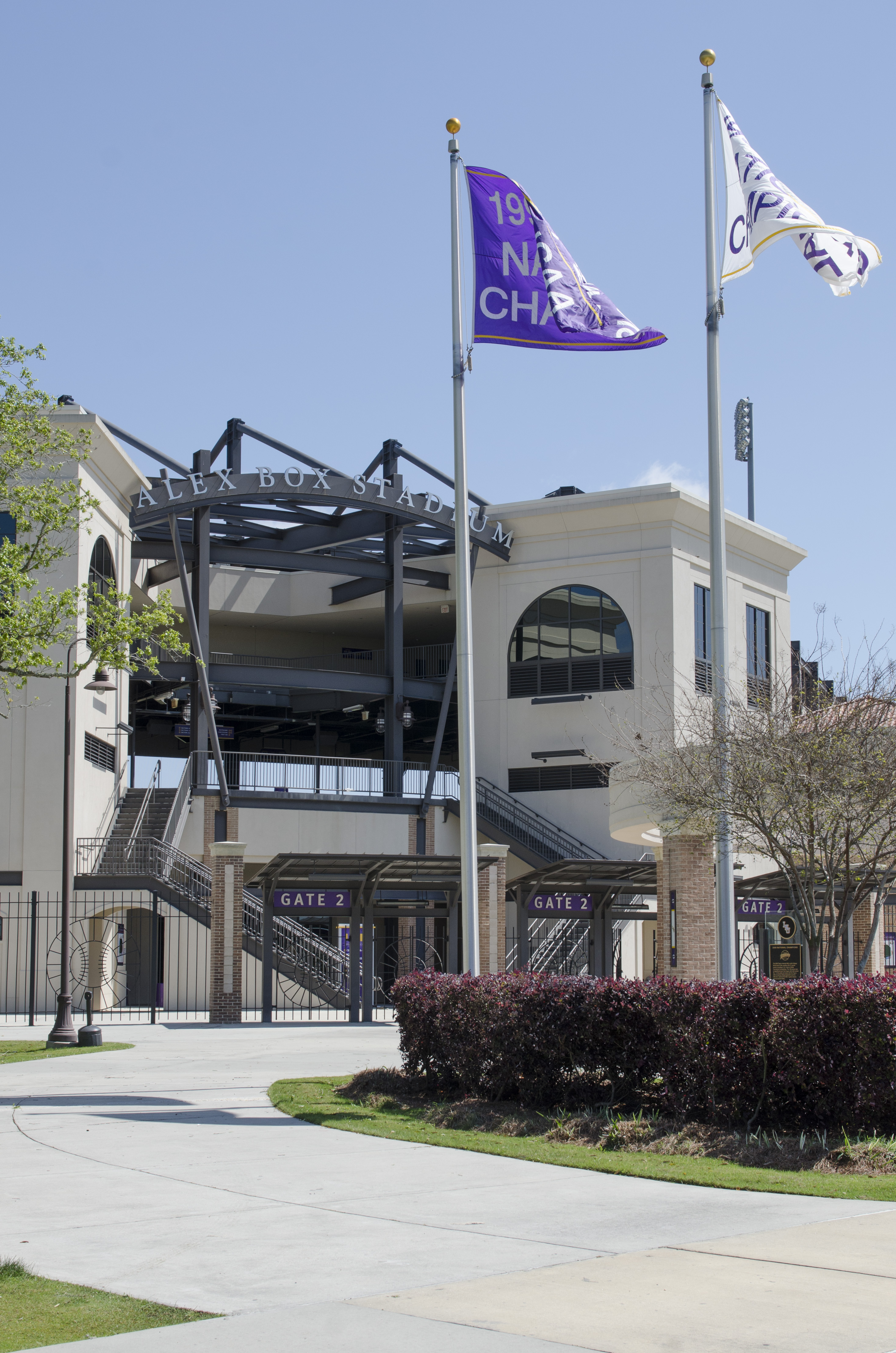
Alex Box Stadium, Skip Bertman Field - Main gate

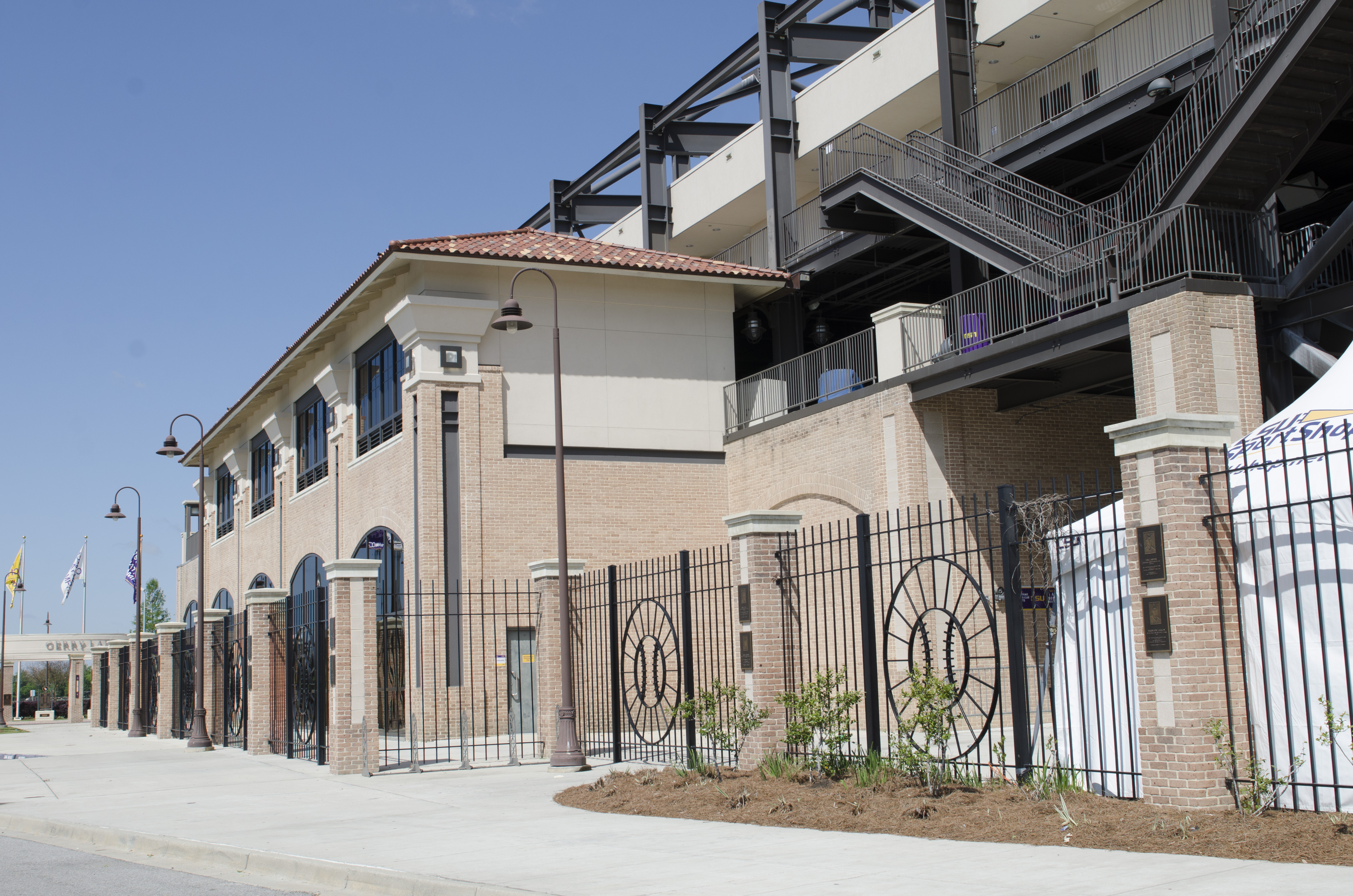
The exterior façade of Alex Box Stadium, Skip Bertman Field

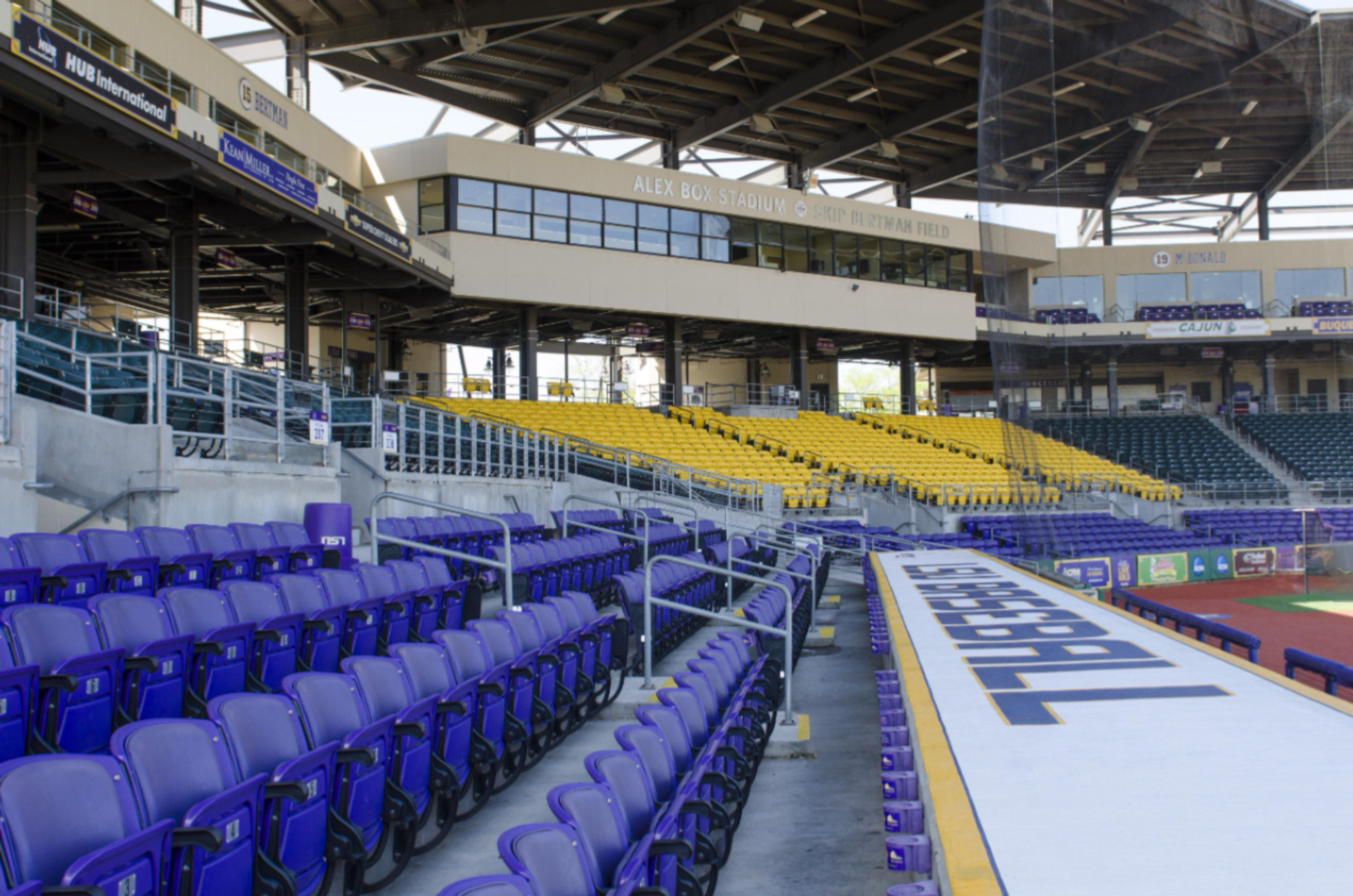
Alex Box Stadium, Skip Bertman Field - Grandstand and Press box from seats

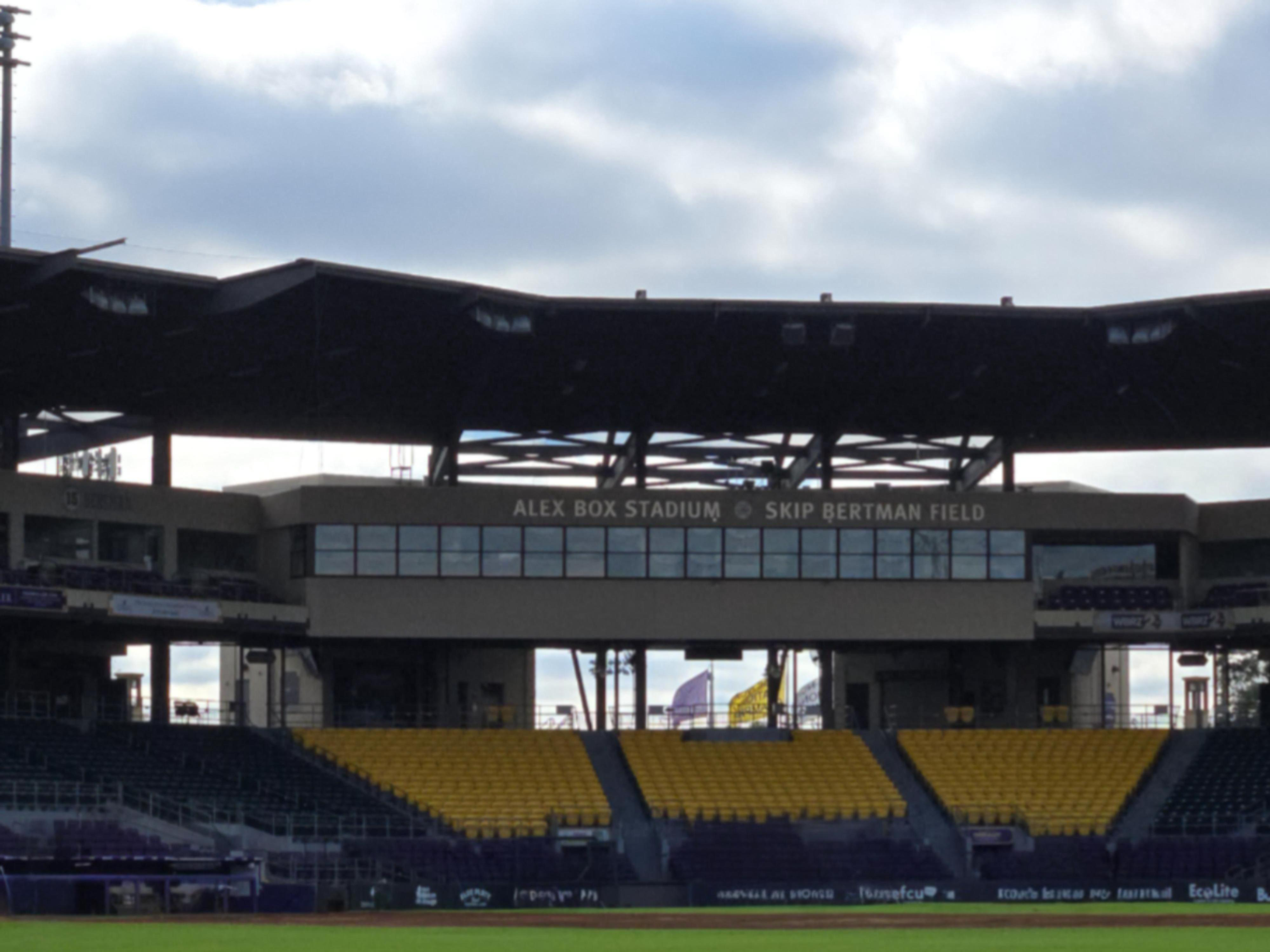
Alex Box Stadium, Skip Bertman Field - Grandstand and Press Box from field

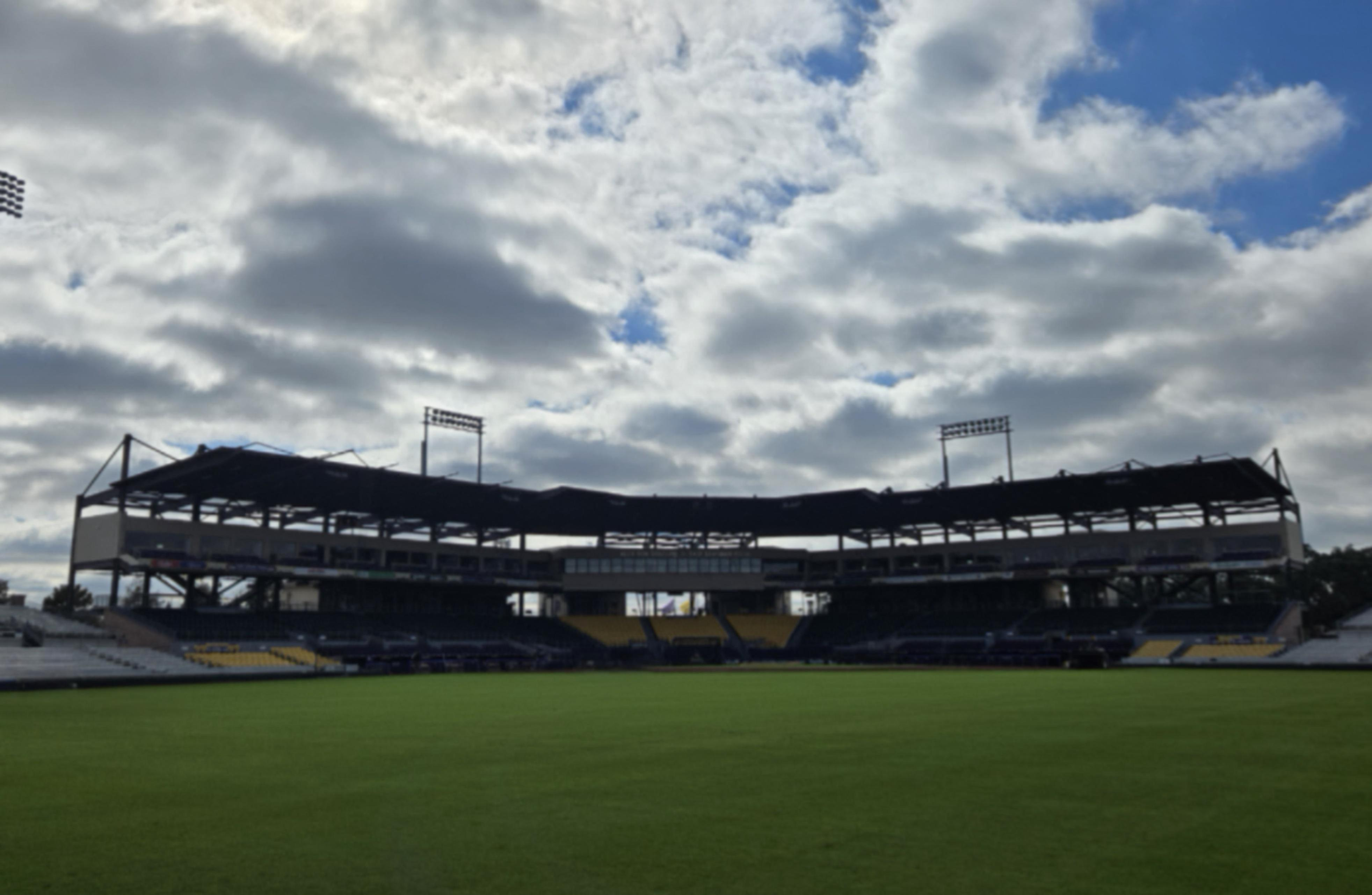
Alex Box Stadium, Skip Bertman Field - Grandstand

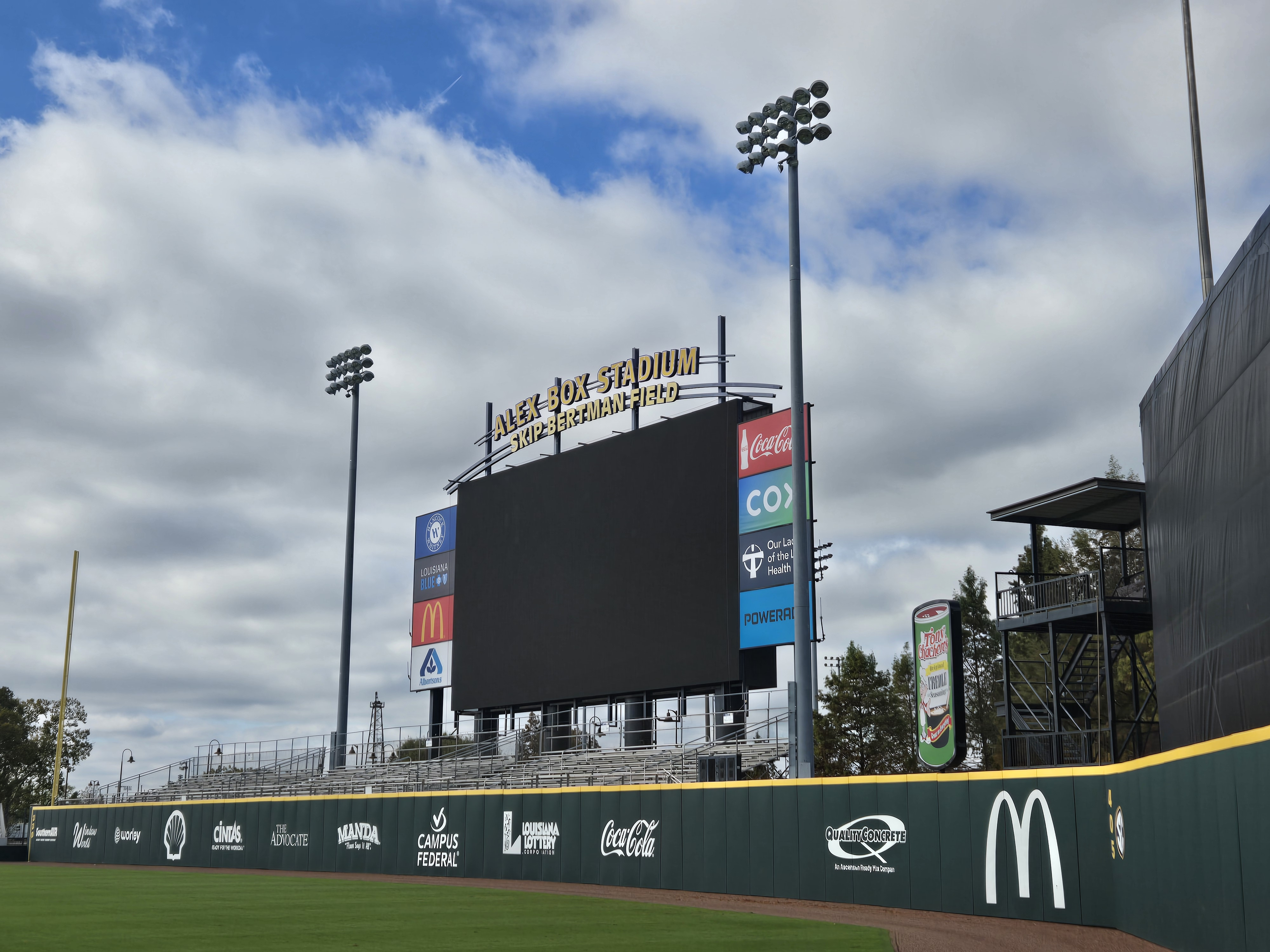
High-definition scoreboard at Alex Box Stadium, Skip Bertman Field

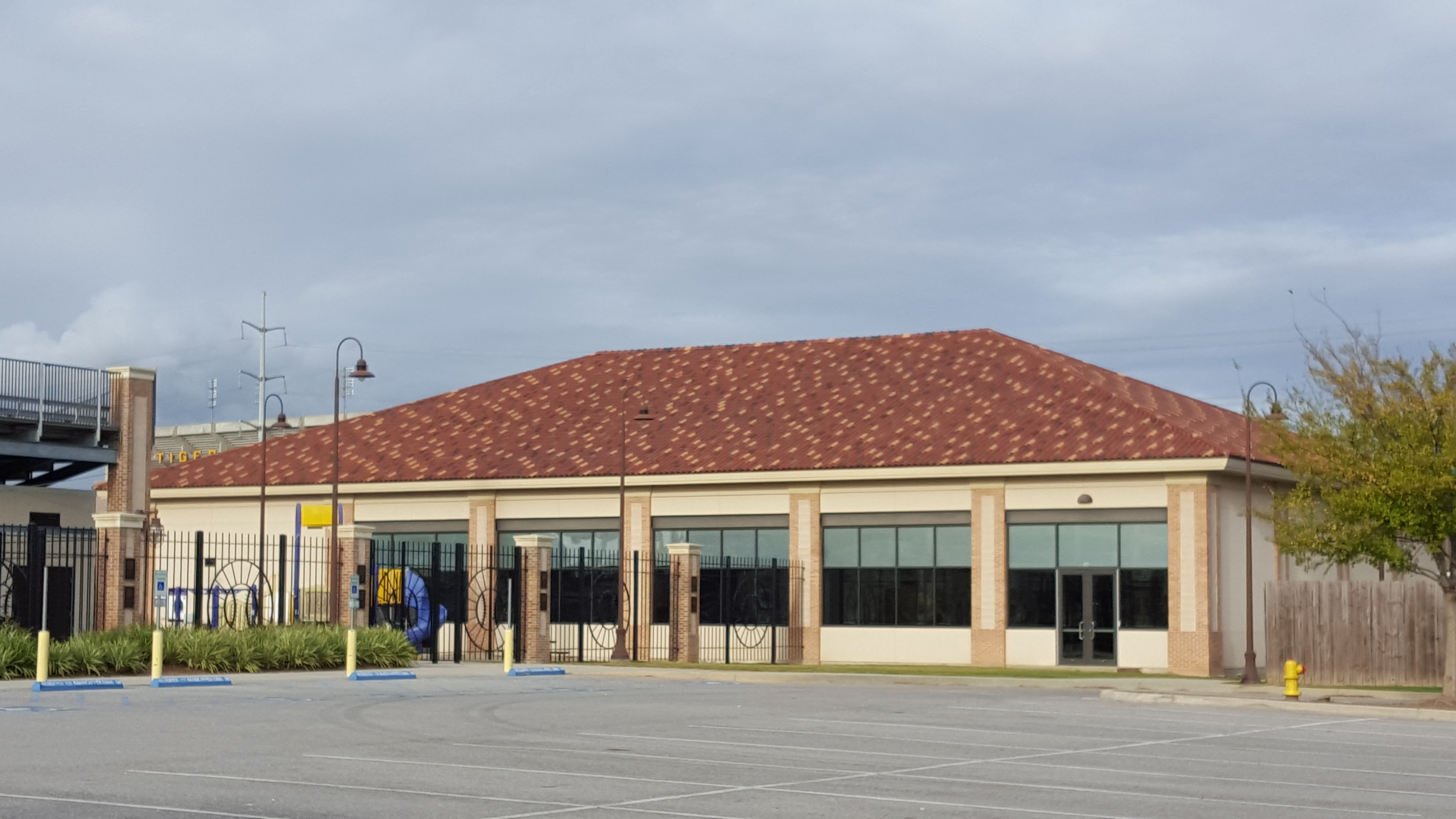
Worley Family Hitting Facility

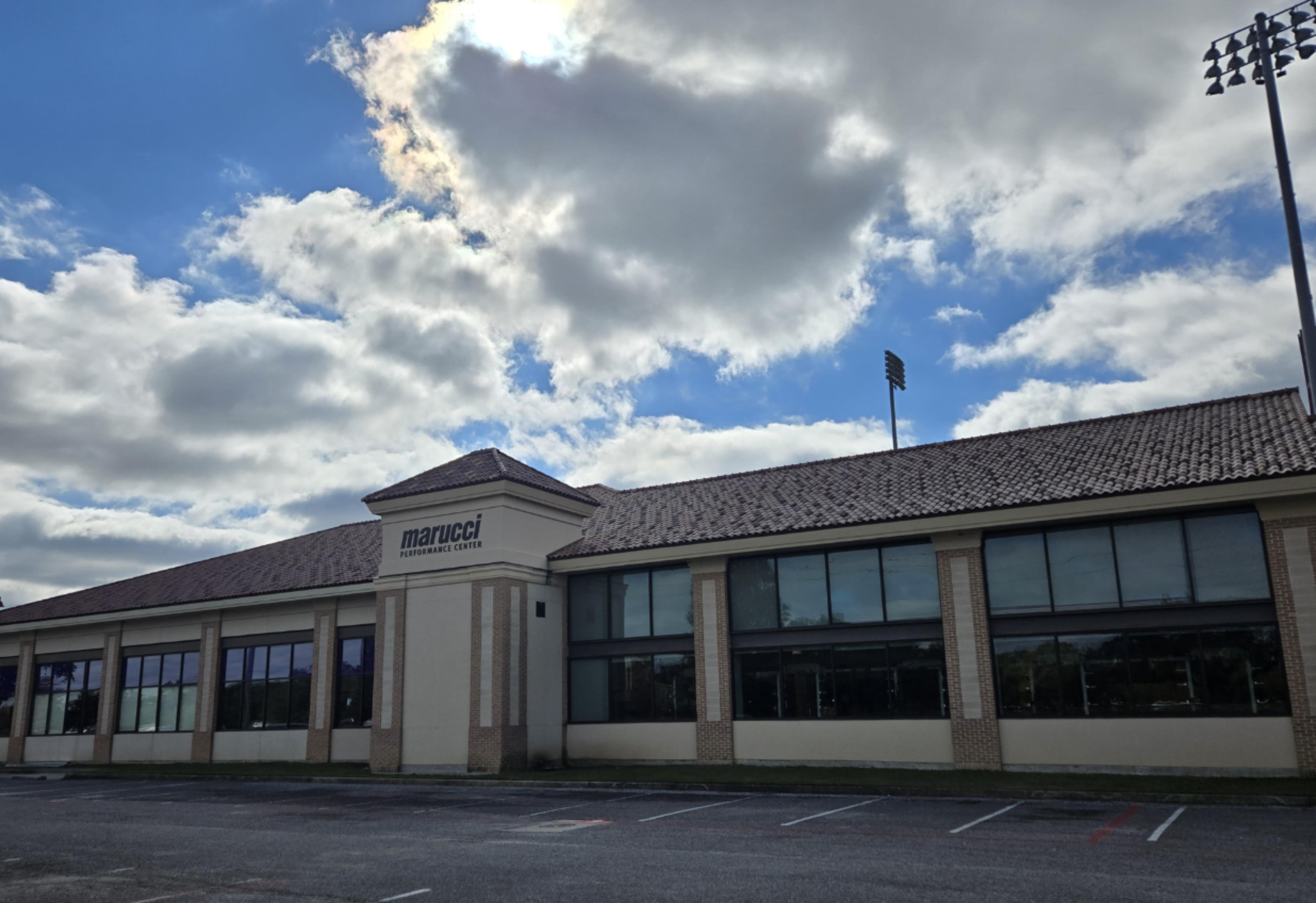
Marucci Performance Center

== See also ==
- LSU Tigers baseball
- LSU Tigers and Lady Tigers
- List of NCAA Division I baseball venues
