= Jacob Hannemann =

American baseball player (born 1991)

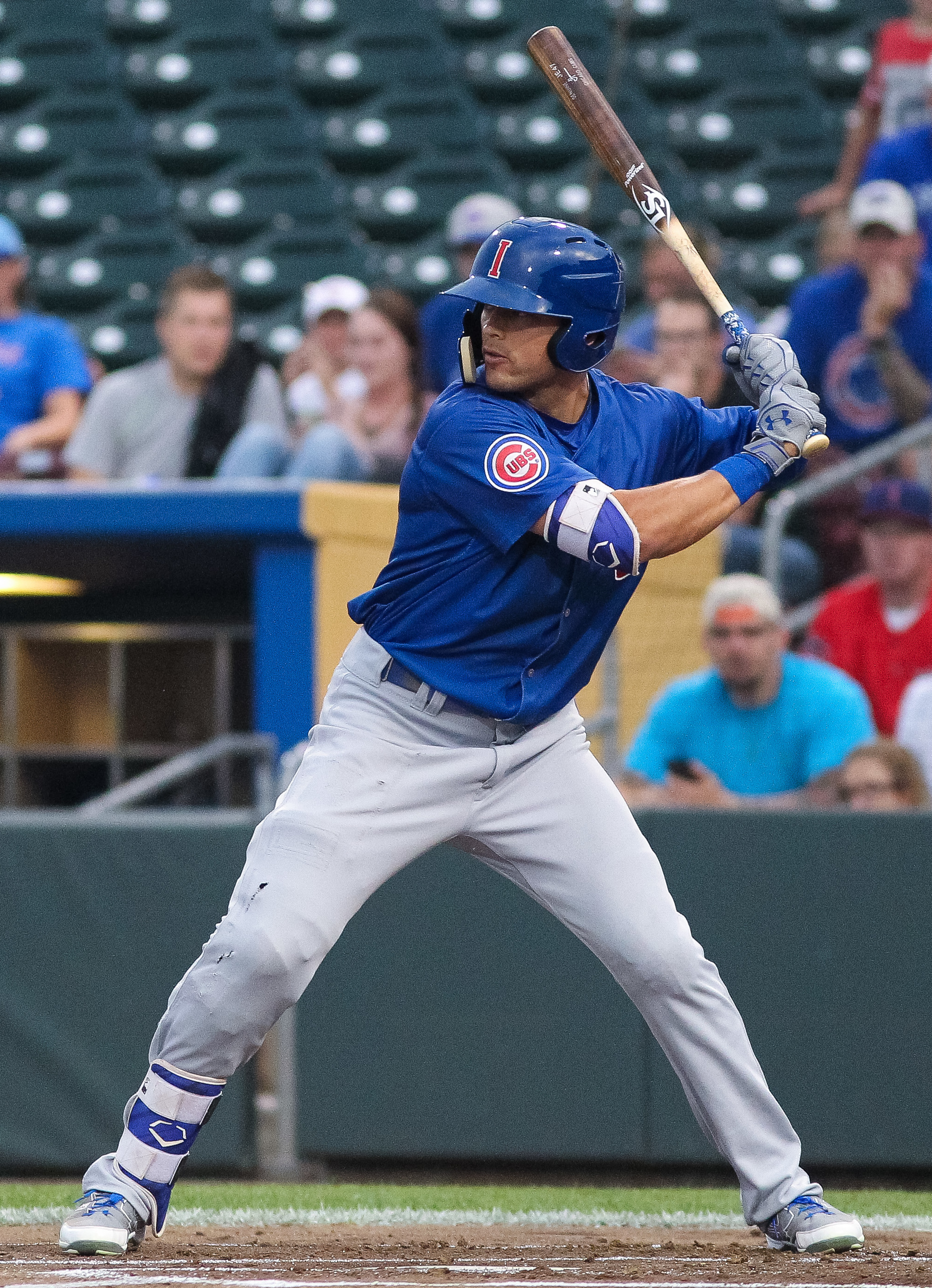
- Hannemann with the Iowa Cubs in 2017
- Outfielder
- Born: April 29, 1991 (age 35); Kahuku, Hawaii, U.S.
- Batted: Left Threw: Left

MLB debut
- September 9, 2017, for the Seattle Mariners

Last MLB appearance
- October 1, 2017, for the Seattle Mariners

MLB statistics
- Batting average: .150
- Home runs: 1
- Runs batted in: 1
- Stats at Baseball Reference

Teams
- Seattle Mariners (2017)

Jacob Howard Hannemann (born April 29, 1991) is an American former professional baseball outfielder. He played for the Seattle Mariners of Major League Baseball in 2017. Prior to his professional career, he attended Brigham Young University (BYU) and played college baseball for the BYU Cougars.

== Amateur career ==
Hannemann attended Lone Peak High School in Highland, Utah, graduating in 2010. The Kansas City Royals selected Hannemann in the 48th round of the 2010 MLB draft. Though the Royals offered Hannemann a $250,000 signing bonus, Hannemann opted not to sign.

While a student at Lone Peak, Hannemann was offered a scholarship to attend Brigham Young University (BYU) to play college baseball and college football for the BYU Cougars. He agreed to attend BYU, but postponed his enrollment by two years so that he could complete a two-year mission for the Church of Jesus Christ of Latter-day Saints in Little Rock, Arkansas. Hanneman enrolled in BYU in 2012, but injured his hip flexor, knees, and wrist, and had to take a redshirt for the 2012 season. Playing for the school's baseball team in the 2013 season, Hannemann had a .344 batting average with five home runs, 29 runs batted in, 14 stolen bases in 15 attempts, a .415 on-base percentage, and a .553 slugging percentage. He was named the West Coast Conference Freshman of the Year and a Freshman All-American by Louisville Slugger.

== Professional career ==
=== Chicago Cubs ===
The Chicago Cubs selected Hannemann in the third round of the 2013 MLB draft, and offered him a $1 million signing bonus. Hannemann signed with the Cubs, and made his professional debut, but he appeared in only 17 games for the Arizona League Cubs of the Rookie-level Arizona League and the Boise Hawks of the Low-A Northwest League before injuries ended his season. In 2014, Hannemann began the season with the Kane County Cougars of the Single-A Midwest League and was promoted to the Daytona Cubs of the High-A Florida State League. After the season, the Cubs assigned Hannemann to the Arizona Fall League, where he batted .279 in 17 games.

Hannemann began the 2015 season with the Myrtle Beach Pelicans of the High-A Carolina League, and was promoted to the Tennessee Smokies of the Double-A Southern League in April. Hannemann ended 2015 with a .244 batting average, along with 26 stolen bases. Hannemann returned to the Smokies in 2016, where he batted .247 with 10 home runs and 30 RBI. On November 18, 2016, the Cubs added Hannemann to their 40-man roster to protect him from the Rule 5 draft. He began the 2017 season with Tennessee, and was promoted to the Iowa Cubs of the Triple-A Pacific Coast League.

=== Seattle Mariners ===
On September 4, 2017, the Seattle Mariners claimed Hannemann off waivers. The Mariners promoted him to the major leagues the next day. Hannemann made his first major league start on September 25 in center field against the Oakland Athletics, going 0-for-4. He hit his first major league home run on September 30, off of Ricky Nolasco.

=== Chicago Cubs (second stint) ===
On October 26, 2017, Hannemann was claimed off waivers by the Chicago Cubs. On November 20, Hannemann was removed from the 40-man roster and sent outright to the Triple-A Iowa Cubs. He spent all of the 2018 season with Iowa, playing in 116 games and batting .238/.297/.340 with six home runs, 32 RBI, and 22 stolen bases.

Hannemann was assigned to Iowa to start the 2019 season. In 44 games for the team, he batted .248/.333/.453 with five home runs, 15 RBI, and eight stolen bases. Hannemann was released by the Cubs organization on July 5, 2019.

== Personal life ==
Hannemann was born in Kahuku, Hawaii. His family moved to Utah when Jacob was eight years old. He is a cousin of Mufi Hannemann, the former mayor of Honolulu.

Hannemann is an Eagle Scout. During his mission in Little Rock, he worked with people addicted to alcohol and cigarettes. Hannemann's younger brother, Micah Hannemann, also played college football for BYU before playing professionally. His brothers Ammon and Kyle played college football for BYU and Southern Utah respectively. Their father is of Samoan heritage.
