= Andy Masur =

American radio sportscaster

Andy Masur (born May 10, 1967) is an American sportscaster who was formerly the radio play-by-play announcer for the Chicago White Sox Radio Network for WGN (720).

Masur is a native of Glenview, Illinois, a graduate from Maine East High School in Park Ridge, Illinois and Bradley University in Peoria, Illinois.

Masur started his radio career in Peoria, Illinois working at co-owned stations WMBD and WKZW (now WPBG). In Chicago, he worked for Metro Networks from 1995 to 1997, reporting traffic, news and sports for several Chicago stations, including WBBM (780), WMAQ (670), WGN Radio, and WTMX (101.9). He was then a sports anchor and reporter at One On One Sports Radio Network (later Sporting News Radio) from 1997 to 1999. Starting in 1999, Masur began to work exclusively for WGN, hosting Chicago Cubs pre-game and post-game shows and anchoring morning and evening drive slots with sports coverage; in addition, he substituted for play-by-play announcer Pat Hughes during some Cubs games. Masur was also the radio voice of Loyola University Chicago men's basketball from 2002 until working at XEPRS-AM.

In 2007, Masur ended his job in Chicago and joined XEPRS-AM (1090 in Tijuana) in the San Diego radio market; there, he has done play-by-play for the San Diego Padres and for University of San Diego Toreros men's basketball. In 2012, he was also named as secondary play-by-play announcer for Padres telecasts on Fox Sports San Diego, occasionally substituting for lead TV announcer Dick Enberg in addition to working the XEPRS radio broadcasts.

Masur returned to Chicago in 2018 and became pre-game host of the Chicago White Sox Radio Network for WGN. He was also a backup play-by-play announcer for two years. On June 30, 2020, Masur was confirmed as the team's new play-by-play announcer, joining Darrin Jackson in the radio booth three months after the unexpected death of Masur's predecessor, Ed Farmer. WGN chose not to renew the rights for the White Sox after the 2020 season, and new rightsholder WMVP hired Cubs television voice Len Kasper to take over the team's play-by-play duties.
