= Larry H. Miller Sports Complex =

Sports stadium in Provo, Utah, United States

Larry H. Miller Field
- Interactive map of Larry H. Miller Field
- Location: Provo, Utah, United States
- Coordinates: 40°15′18″N 111°39′09″W
- Owner: Brigham Young University
- Operator: Brigham Young University
- Capacity: 2,204
- Surface: Turf
- Scoreboard: Electronic
- Public transit: UVX (at BYU Stadium station)

Construction
- Opened: 2001

Tenant
- BYU Cougars baseball (NCAA)

Larry H. Miller Sports Complex is a stadium complex in Provo, Utah. The complex is named after businessman Larry H. Miller; the field is primarily used for baseball. The ballpark has a seating capacity of 2,204 people. It was opened in 2001. Larry H. Miller Field was previously the home of Provo Angels. It currently hosts the BYU Cougars baseball team. In 2012, college baseball writer Eric Sorenson ranked the field as the second-best setting and second-most underrated venue in NCAA Division I baseball.

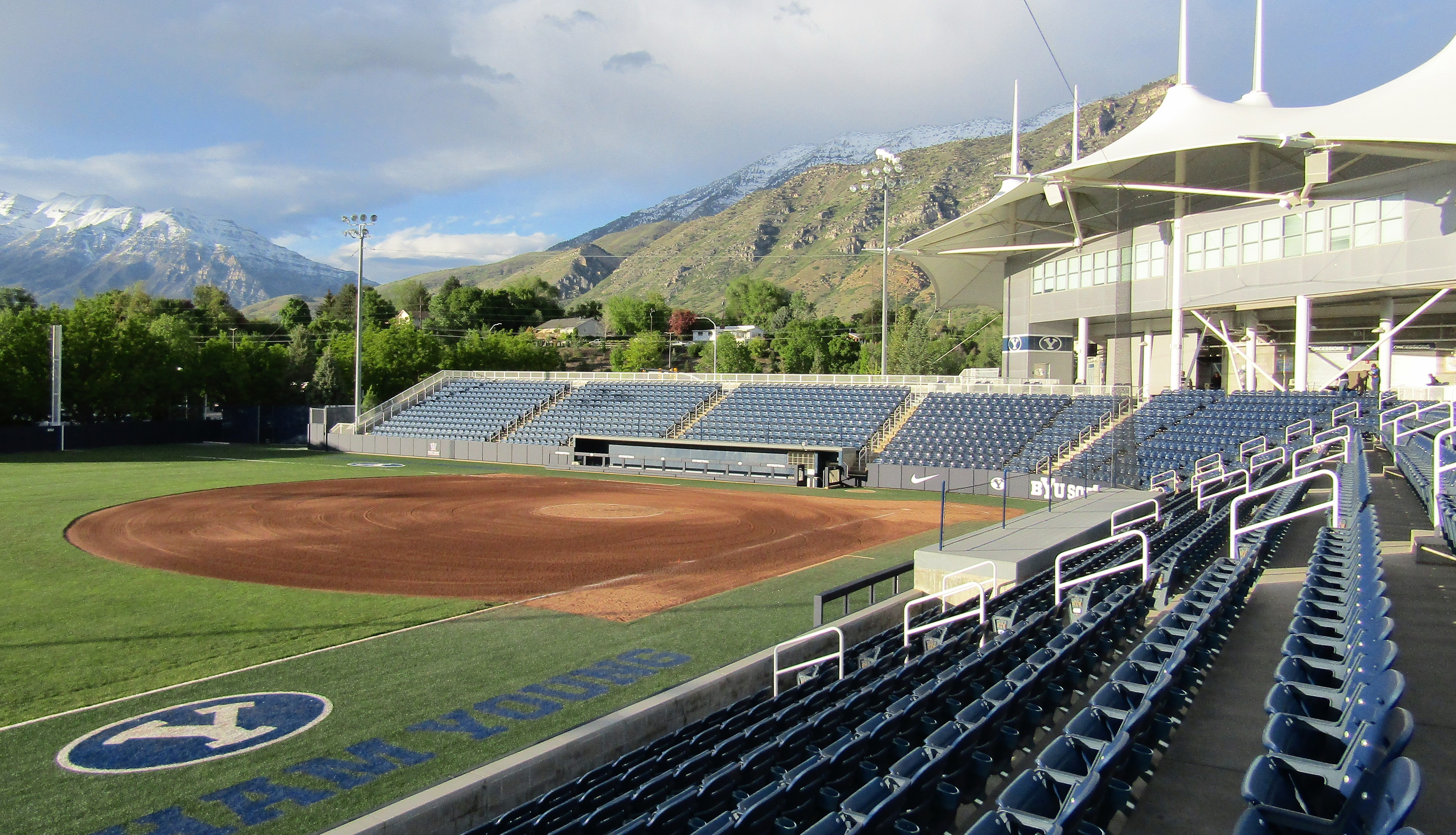
Gail Miller Field

A 20-foot by 50-foot video board was installed in 2022.

The complex has been home to BYU baseball since it opened in 2001. It is described as a "unique baseball-softball back-to-back complex." BYU baseball plays on Larry H. Miller Field. The softball team plays on Gail Miller Field.

Miller Park seats 2,204 fans in two tiers. 1,000 additional fans can be placed in temporary seating when necessary. There is a press box that hosts radio and television stations, other media facilities, concession stands, event facilities, training rooms, batting cages, offices, etc. The taut spire-accented tensile roof is made from Teflon.

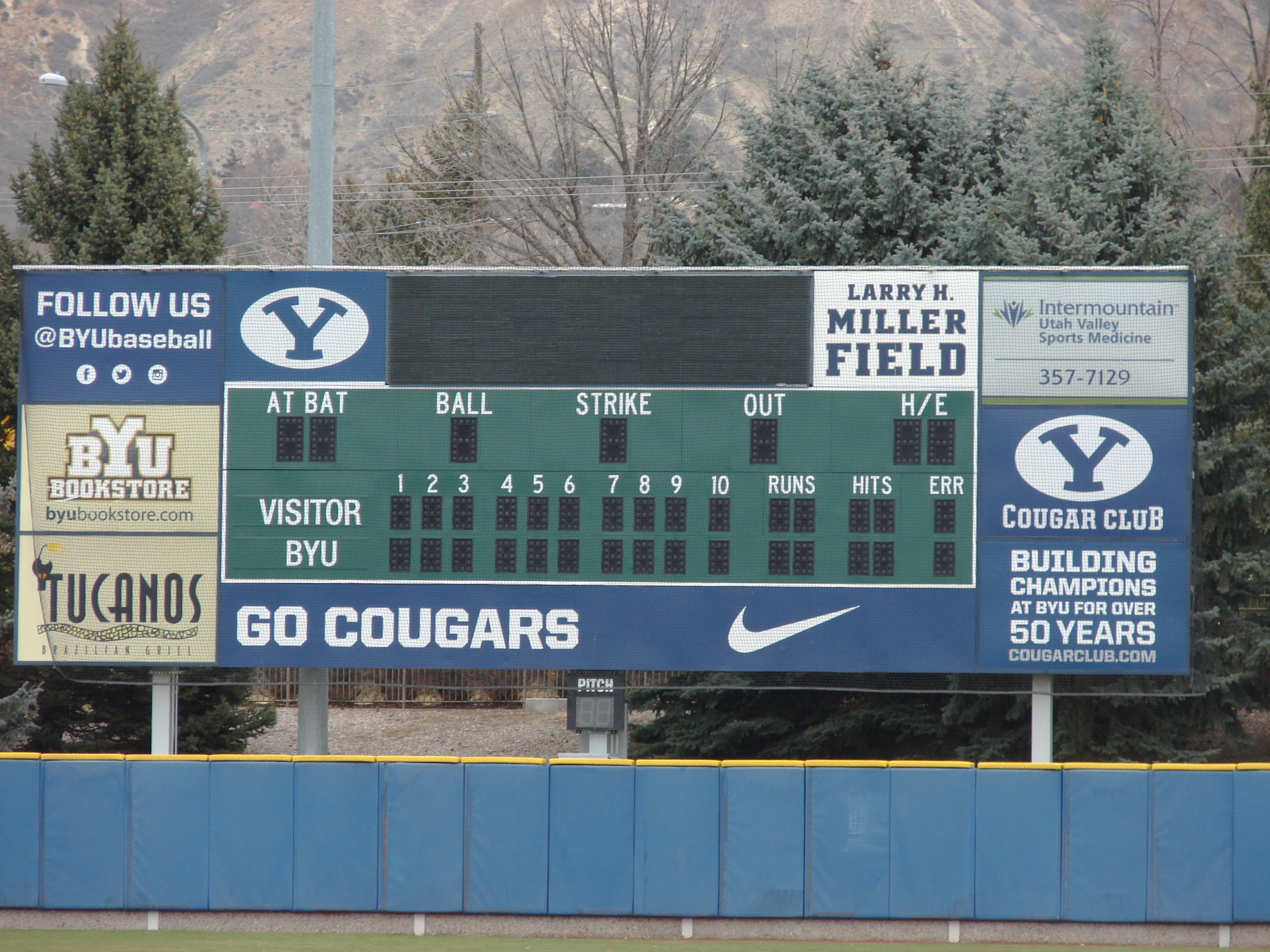
Larry H. Miller Field scoreboard at BYU

== See also ==
- List of NCAA Division I baseball venues
