= 1979 College Baseball All-America Team =

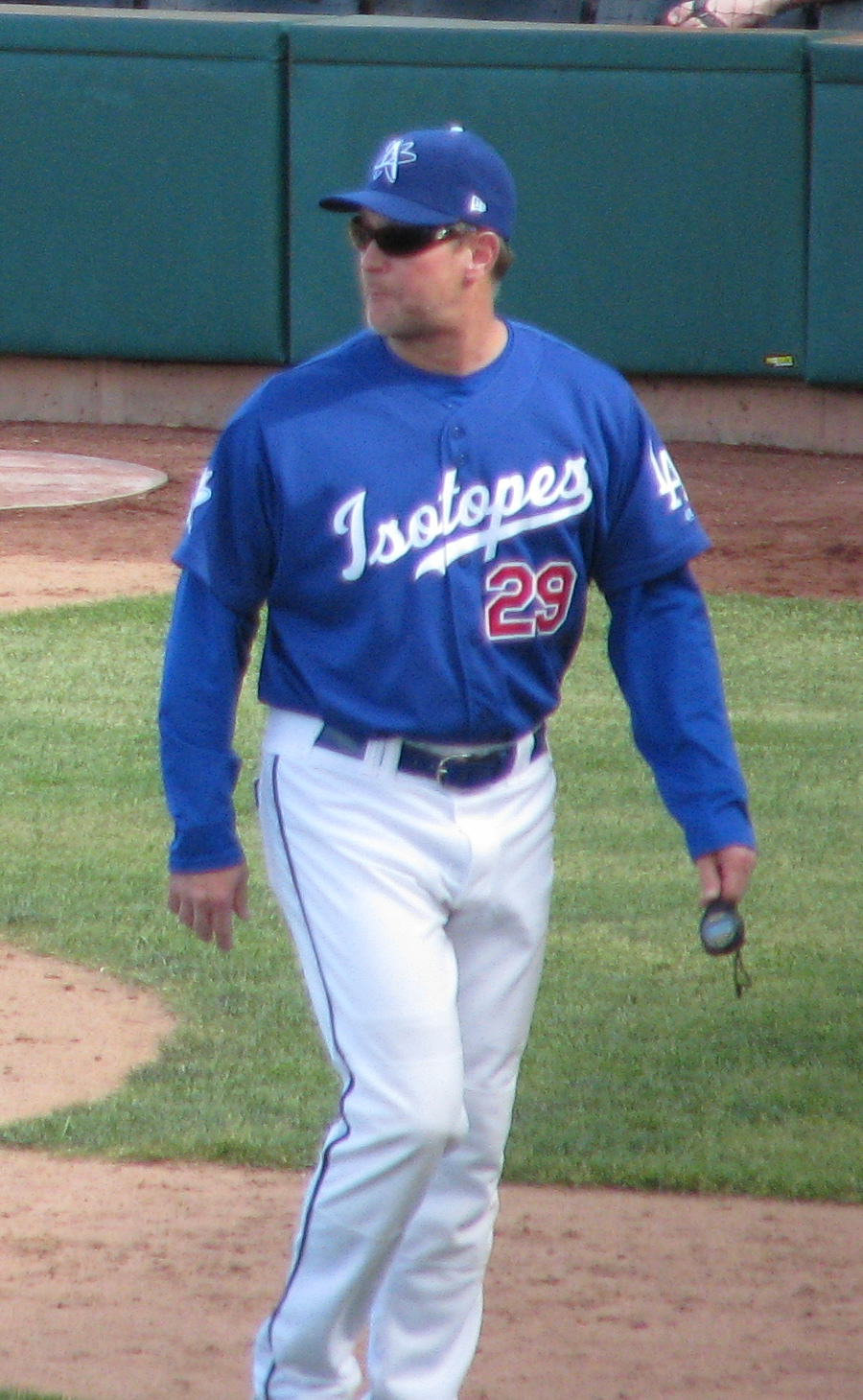
1979 All-Americans included 5× MLB All-Star Tim Wallach.

This is a list of college baseball players named first team All-Americans for the 1979 NCAA Division I baseball season. From 1964 to 1980, there were two generally recognized All-America selectors for baseball: the American Baseball Coaches Association and The Sporting News.

== Key ==
A	American Baseball Coaches Association
S	The Sporting News
	Member of the National College Baseball Hall of Fame
	Consensus All-American – selected by both organizations
	Consensus All-American – selected by one organization

== All-Americans ==
Position	Name	School	#	A	S	Other awards and honors
Pitcher	Jerry Don Gleaton	Texas	1	✓	—	
Pitcher	Steve Howe	Michigan	1	—	✓	
Pitcher	Tim Leary	UCLA	1	—	✓	
Pitcher	Derek Tatsuno	Hawaii	1	✓	—	
Catcher	Herb Orensky	Delaware	1	✓	—	
Catcher	Marc Sullivan	Florida	1	—	✓	
First baseman	Tim Wallach	Cal State Fullerton	2	✓	✓	Golden Spikes Award The Sporting News Player of the Year
Second baseman	Nick Capra	Oklahoma	1	—	✓	
Second baseman	Mike Gates	Pepperdine	1	✓	—	
Shortstop	Randy Ingle	Appalachian State	1	✓	—	
Shortstop	Fran Mullins	Santa Clara	1	—	✓	
Third baseman	Scott Kuvinka	Ohio	1	—	✓	
Third baseman	Murphy Su'a	BYU	1	✓	—	
Outfielder	Jim Auten	UCLA	1	—	✓	
Outfielder	John Delmonte	Saint Joseph's	1	—	✓	
Outfielder	Mike Kelley	Mississippi State	1	✓	—	
Outfielder	Rick Leach	Michigan	1	—	✓	
Outfielder	Mark Seeger	Northern Arizona	1	✓	—	
Outfielder	Rob Townley	Long Beach State	1	✓	—	
Designated hitter	Mike Stenhouse	Harvard	1	—	✓	
Designated hitter	Mark Strucher	Georgia Southern	1	✓	—	

== See also ==
- List of college baseball awards
