= 1979 NCAA Division I baseball season =

Baseball season

- Number of teams: 246

NCAA tournament

College World Series
- Champions: Cal State Fullerton (1st title)
- Runners-up: Arkansas (1st CWS Appearance)
- Winning coach: Augie Garrido (1st title)
- MOP: Tony Hudson (Cal State Fullerton)

Seasons
- ← 1978 1980 →

The 1979 NCAA Division I baseball season, play of college baseball in the United States organized by the National Collegiate Athletic Association (NCAA) began in the spring of 1979. The season progressed through the regular season and concluded with the 1979 College World Series. The College World Series, held for the thirty-third time in 1979, consisted of one team from each of eight regional competitions and was held in Omaha, Nebraska at Johnny Rosenblatt Stadium as a double-elimination tournament. Cal State Fullerton claimed the championship for the first time.

== Conference winners ==
This is a partial list of conference champions from the 1979 season. The NCAA sponsored regional competitions to determine the College World Series participants. Seven regionals of four teams and one of six each competed in double-elimination tournaments, with the winners advancing to Omaha. 21 teams earned automatic bids by winning their conference championship while 13 teams earned at-large selections. The Trans America Athletic Conference, as a new league, did not earn an automatic bid.

Conference	Regular season winner	Conference tournament	Tournament venue • city	Tournament winner
Atlantic Coast Conference	Clemson	No tournament		
Big Eight Conference	East - Oklahoma; West - Missouri	1979 Big Eight Conference baseball tournament	All Sports Stadium • Oklahoma City, OK	Oklahoma
Big Ten Conference	Michigan State	No tournament		
Eastern 8		1979 Eastern 8 Conference baseball tournament	Hershey, PA	George Washington
ECAC		1979 Eastern College Athletic Conference baseball tournament	Worcester, MA	Connecticut
EIBL	Navy	No tournament		
Mid-American Conference	Miami (OH)	No tournament		
Pacific-10 Conference	North - Washington State; South - UCLA	No tournament		
Southeastern Conference	East - Florida; West - Mississippi State	1979 Southeastern Conference baseball tournament	Dudy Noble Field • Starkville, MS	Mississippi State
SCBA	Cal State Fullerton	No tournament		
Southern Conference	The Citadel	No tournament		
Southwest Conference	Texas	1979 Southwest Conference baseball tournament	Disch–Falk Field • Austin, TX	Texas
Trans America Athletic Conference	N/A	1979 Trans America Athletic Conference baseball tournament	Centenary Park • Shreveport, LA	Mercer
Yankee Conference	Maine; UMass	No tournament		

== Conference standings ==
The following is an incomplete list of conference standings:

1979 Eastern College Athletic Conference baseball standings
	Conf.				Overall
Team	W		L	PCT	W		L	PCT
Metropolitan
Seton Hall ‍‍‍^{y}		–		–	32	–	11	.744
No. 28 St. John's ‍‍‍^{y}		–		–	26	–	11	.703
Fordham ‍‍‍		–		–	18	–	13	.581
Canisius ‍‍‍		–		–	8	–	20	.286
New England
Maine ‍‍‍		–		–	23	–	9	.719
No. 8 Connecticut ‍‍‡‍^{y}		–		–	31	–	13	.705
Fairfield ‍‍‍		–		–	21	–	12	.636
UMass ‍‍‍		–		–	24	–	17	.585
Holy Cross ‍‍‍		–		–	16	–	13	.552
Providence ‍‍‍		–		–	14	–	13	.519
South
George Washington ‍‍‍^{y}		–		–	22	–	9	.710
James Madison ‍‍‍		–		–	31	–	13	.705
Richmond ‍‍‍		–		–	23	–	18	.561
Catholic University ‍‍‍		–		–	16	–	15	.516
Old Dominion ‍‍‍		–		–	16	–	30	.348
Georgetown ‍‍‍		–		–	8	–	23	.258
x – Division champion ‡ – Tournament champion y – Invited to the NCAA tournament As of June 30, 1979; Rankings from Collegiate Baseball

1979 NCAA Division I baseball independents standings
	Conf.				Overall
Team	W		L	PCT	W		L	PCT
No. 7 Miami (FL) ‍‍‍^{y}		–		–	55	–	11	.833
No. 11 Hawaii ‍‍‍^{y}		–		–	69	–	15	.821
No. 23 Texas–Pan American ‍‍‍^{y}		–		–	52	–	12	.813
Air Force ‍‍‍		–		–	33	–	13	.717
No. 27 Florida State ‍‍‍^{y}		–		–	43	–	17	.717
Mercer ‍‍‍		–		–	38	–	16	.704
Villanova ‍‍‍		–		–	16	–	9	.640
Detroit ‍‍‍		–		–	34	–	22	.607
No. 11 Gonzaga ‍‍‍		–		–	25	–	17	.595
Stetson ‍‍‍		–		–	26	–	24	.520
Georgia Tech ‍‍‍		–		–	15	–	16	.484
Campbell ‍‍‍		–		–	17	–	20	.459
Notre Dame ‍‍‍		–		–	14	–	19	.424
Louisville ‍‍‍		–		–	18	–	27	.400
Northern Iowa ‍‍‍		–		–	11	–	17	.393
Lafayette ‍‍‍		–		–	9	–	15	.375
Hofstra ‍‍‍		–		–	6	–	18	.250
y – Invited to the NCAA tournament As of June 30, 1979; Rankings from Collegiate Baseball

1979 Pacific-10 Conference baseball standings
	Conf.				Overall
Team	W		L	PCT	W		L	PCT
Northern
No. 29 Washington State ^{x}‍‍‍	12	–	3	.800	40	–	10	.800
Washington ‍‍‍	11	–	5	.688	37	–	13	.740
Oregon State ‍‍‍	4	–	11	.267	21	–	19	.525
Oregon ‍‍‍	3	–	11	.214	14	–	27	.341
Southern
No. 9 UCLA ^{x}‍‍‍^{y}	21	–	9	.700	43	–	18	.705
No. 5 Arizona ‍‍‍^{y}	17	–	13	.567	43	–	25	.632
California ‍‍‍	16	–	14	.533	31	–	25	.554
Southern California ‍‍‍	15	–	15	.500	33	–	24	.579
Stanford ‍‍‍	13	–	17	.433	35	–	23	.603
Arizona State ‍‍‍	8	–	22	.267	32	–	31	.508
x – Division champion y – Invited to the NCAA tournament As of June 30, 1979; Rankings from Collegiate Baseball

1979 Southeastern Conference baseball standings
	Conf.				Overall
Team	W		L	PCT	W		L	PCT
Eastern Division
No. 19 Florida ^{x}‍‍‍^{y}	16	–	8	.667	40	–	20	.667
Kentucky ‍‍‍	13	–	11	.542	29	–	18	.617
Georgia ‍‍‍	11	–	11	.500	24	–	18	.571
Tennessee ‍‍‍	10	–	14	.417	25	–	22	.532
Vanderbilt ‍‍‍	8	–	14	.364	21	–	25	.457
Western Division
No. 6 Mississippi State ^{x}‍‍‡‍^{y}	17	–	2	.895	48	–	12	.800
LSU ‍‍‍	13	–	7	.650	34	–	20	.630
Ole Miss ‍‍‍	9	–	10	.474	24	–	13	.649
Auburn ‍‍‍	7	–	14	.333	21	–	21	.500
Alabama ‍‍‍	4	–	17	.190	18	–	27	.400
x – Division champion ‡ – Tournament champion y – Invited to the NCAA tournament As of June 30, 1979; Rankings from Collegiate Baseball

1979 Southern California Baseball Association standings
	Conf.				Overall
Team	W		L	PCT	W		L	PCT
No. 1 Cal State Fullerton ‍†‍‍^{y}	23	–	4	.852	60	–	14	.811
No. 3 Pepperdine ‍‍‍^{y}	19	–	9	.679	47	–	16	.746
Long Beach State ‍‍‍	17	–	10	.630	40	–	22	.645
San Diego ‍‍‍	14	–	12	.538	32	–	19	.627
Loyola Marymount ‍‍‍	12	–	16	.429	29	–	34	.460
Cal State Los Angeles ‍‍‍	9	–	19	.321	25	–	39	.391
UC Irvine ‍‍‍	8	–	19	.296	22	–	37	.373
UC Santa Barbara ‍‍‍	7	–	20	.259	17	–	31	.354
† – Conference champion y – Invited to the NCAA tournament As of June 30, 1979; Rankings from Collegiate Baseball

1979 Southern Conference baseball standings
	Conf.				Overall
Team	W		L	PCT	W		L	PCT
The Citadel ‍†‍‍^{y}	13	–	3	.813	27	–	15	.643
Appalachian State ‍‍‍	10	–	5	.667	20	–	22	.476
East Tennessee State ‍‍‍	10	–	5	.667	29	–	23	.558
Marshall ‍‍‍	10	–	6	.625	23	–	15	.605
Furman ‍‍‍	9	–	7	.563	16	–	16	.500
Western Carolina ‍‍‍	6	–	7	.462	13	–	15	.464
Chattanooga ‍‍‍	6	–	10	.375	16	–	15	.516
Davidson ‍‍‍	5	–	11	.313	13	–	23	.361
VMI ‍‍‍	0	–	15	.000	6	–	25	.194
y – Invited to the NCAA tournament As of June 30, 1979; Rankings from Collegiate Baseball

1979 Southwest Conference baseball standings
	Conf.				Overall
Team	W		L	PCT	W		L	PCT
No. 4 Texas ‍†‍‡‍^{y}	22	–	2	.917	61	–	8	.884
No. 2 Arkansas ‍‍‍^{y}	19	–	5	.792	49	–	15	.766
Baylor ‍‍‍	13	–	9	.591	34	–	15	.694
Texas A&M ‍‍‍	13	–	10	.565	30	–	20	.600
Houston ‍‍‍	11	–	13	.458	27	–	17	.614
Texas Tech ‍‍‍	9	–	15	.375	16	–	23	.410
Southern Methodist ‍‍‍	7	–	16	.304	21	–	26	.447
Texas Christian ‍‍‍	7	–	17	.292	21	–	24	.467
Rice ‍‍‍	5	–	19	.208	20	–	29	.408
† – Conference champion ‡ – Tournament champion y – Invited to the NCAA tournament As of June 30, 1979; Rankings from Collegiate Baseball

1979 Trans America Athletic Conference baseball standings
	Conf.				Overall
Team	W		L	PCT	W		L	PCT
Mercer ‍‍‡‍	0	–	0	–	38	–	16	.704
Oklahoma City ‍‍‍	0	–	0	–	31	–	23	.574
Centenary ‍‍‍	0	–	0	–	28	–	19	.596
Northeast Louisiana ‍‍‍	0	–	0	–	22	–	26	.458
Hardin–Simmons ‍‍‍	0	–	0	–	14	–	25	.359
‡ – Tournament champion As of June 30, 1979; Rankings from Collegiate Baseball

== College World Series ==
The 1979 season marked the thirty third NCAA baseball tournament, which culminated with the eight team College World Series. The College World Series was held in Omaha, Nebraska. The eight teams played a double-elimination format, with Cal State Fullerton claiming their first championship with a 2–1 win over Arkansas in the final.

Upper round 1
Arkansas	5
Pepperdine	4
Arizona	5
Miami (FL)	1
Texas	11
Connecticut	5
Mississippi State	6
Cal State Fullerton	1

Upper round 2
Arkansas	10
Arizona	3
Texas	8
Mississippi State	2
Lower round 1
Pepperdine	9
Miami (FL)	3
Connecticut	3
Cal State Fullerton	8

Upper final
Arkansas	9
Texas	4
Lower round 2
Mississippi State	4
Pepperdine	5^{10}
Arizona	3
Cal State Fullerton	16

Semifinals
Arkansas	10
Cal State Fullerton	13
Texas	4
Pepperdine	6

Preliminary final
Cal State Fullerton	8
Pepperdine	5

Final
Cal State Fullerton	2
Arkansas	1
