= 1979 Arkansas Razorbacks baseball team =

American college baseball season

1979 Arkansas Razorbacks baseball

East Regional champions

College World Series, Runner-Up
- Conference: Southwest Conference
- Western Division
- Record: 49–15 (19–5 SWC)
- Head coach: Norm DeBriyn (10th season)
- Home stadium: George Cole Field

1979 Southwest Conference baseball standings
| | Conf. | | | | Overall |
| Team | W | | L | PCT | W | | L | PCT |
|---|---|---|---|---|---|---|---|---|
| No. 4 Texas ‍†‍‡‍^{y} | 22 | – | 2 | .917 | 61 | – | 8 | .884 |
| No. 2 Arkansas ‍‍‍^{y} | 19 | – | 5 | .792 | 49 | – | 15 | .766 |
| Baylor ‍‍‍ | 13 | – | 9 | .591 | 34 | – | 15 | .694 |
| Texas A&M ‍‍‍ | 13 | – | 10 | .565 | 30 | – | 20 | .600 |
| Houston ‍‍‍ | 11 | – | 13 | .458 | 27 | – | 17 | .614 |
| Texas Tech ‍‍‍ | 9 | – | 15 | .375 | 16 | – | 23 | .410 |
| Southern Methodist ‍‍‍ | 7 | – | 16 | .304 | 21 | – | 26 | .447 |
| Texas Christian ‍‍‍ | 7 | – | 17 | .292 | 21 | – | 24 | .467 |
| Rice ‍‍‍ | 5 | – | 19 | .208 | 20 | – | 29 | .408 |
† – Conference champion ‡ – Tournament champion y – Invited to the NCAA tournament As of June 30, 1979; Rankings from Collegiate Baseball

The 1979 Arkansas Razorbacks baseball team represented the University of Arkansas in the 1979 NCAA Division I baseball season. The Razorbacks played their home games at George Cole Field, and was led by tenth year head coach Norm DeBriyn. They finished as the national runner-up after falling to Cal State Fullerton in the 1979 College World Series Final.

== Roster ==
1979 Arkansas Razorbacks roster
| Pitchers: Rich Erwin; Steve Krueger; Scott Tabor; John Stanley | Catchers: Ronn Reynolds; Infielders: Johnny Ray; Outfielders: Kevin McReynolds | Coaching staff: Norm DeBriyn – Head Coach |

== Schedule ==
Legend
| Arkansas win |
| Arkansas loss |

1979 Arkansas Razorbacks baseball game log
Regular season
February (4–0)

| Date | Opponent | Stadium | Score | Overall Record | SWC Record |
|---|---|---|---|---|---|
| February 23 | William Jewell | George Cole Field | 7–1 | 1–0 | – |
| February 23 | William Jewell | George Cole Field | 13–2 | 2–0 | – |
| February 27 | Missouri Southern | George Cole Field | 5–0 | 3–0 | – |
| February 27 | Missouri Southern | George Cole Field | 3–2 | 4–0 | – |

March (22–5)

| Date | Opponent | Stadium | Score | Overall Record | SWC Record |
|---|---|---|---|---|---|
| March 2 | Texas | George Cole Field | 2–0 | 5–0 | 1–0 |
| March 3 | Texas | George Cole Field | 2–3 | 5–1 | 1–1 |
| March 3 | Texas | George Cole Field | 0–1 | 5–2 | 1–2 |
| March 4 | Southern Illinois | George Cole Field | 2–3 | 5–3 | 1–2 |
| March 4 | Southern Illinois | George Cole Field | 5–18 | 5–4 | 1–2 |
| March 5 | Southwest Baptist | George Cole Field | 5–0 | 6–4 | 1–2 |
| March 5 | Southwest Baptist | George Cole Field | 9–2 | 7–4 | 1–2 |
| March 6 | Tulsa | George Cole Field | 4–1 | 8–4 | 1–2 |
| March 6 | Tulsa | George Cole Field | 8–1 | 9–4 | 1–2 |
| March 9 | at Rice | Cameron Field | 6–3 | 10–4 | 2–2 |
| March 10 | at Rice | Cameron Field | 8–1 | 11–4 | 3–2 |
| March 10 | at Rice | Cameron Field | 12–3 | 12–4 | 4–2 |
| March 16 | Baylor | George Cole Field | 12–1 | 13–4 | 5–2 |
| March 17 | Baylor | George Cole Field | 5–1 | 14–4 | 6–2 |
| March 17 | Baylor | George Cole Field | 0–4 | 14–5 | 6–3 |
| March 19 | Missouri Western | George Cole Field | 13–0 | 15–5 | 6–3 |
| March 19 | Missouri Western | George Cole Field | 7–6 | 16–5 | 6–3 |
| March 23 | at TCU | TCU Diamond | 7–1 | 17–5 | 7–3 |
| March 24 | at TCU | TCU Diamond | 10–1 | 18–5 | 8–3 |
| March 24 | at TCU | TCU Diamond | 9–4 | 19–5 | 9–3 |
| March 26 | Eastern Michigan | George Cole Field | 6–2 | 20–5 | 9–3 |
| March 26 | Eastern Michigan | George Cole Field | 1–0 | 21–5 | 9–3 |
| March 27 | Iowa | George Cole Field | 7–4 | 22–5 | 9–3 |
| March 27 | Eastern Michigan | George Cole Field | 6–0 | 23–5 | 9–3 |
| March 30 | SMU | George Cole Field | 3–1 | 24–5 | 10–3 |
| March 31 | SMU | George Cole Field | 3–1 | 25–5 | 11–3 |
| March 31 | SMU | George Cole Field | 9–2 | 26–5 | 12–3 |

April (13–3)

| Date | Opponent | Stadium | Score | Overall Record | SWC Record |
|---|---|---|---|---|---|
| April 3 | Southwest Missouri State | George Cole Field | 5–1 | 27–5 | 12–3 |
| April 3 | Southwest Missouri State | George Cole Field | 4–3 | 28–5 | 12–3 |
| April 6 | at Texas Tech | Tech Diamond | 8–9 | 28–6 | 12–4 |
| April 7 | at Texas Tech | Tech Diamond | 6–2 | 29–6 | 13–4 |
| April 7 | at Texas Tech | Tech Diamond | 12–9 | 30–6 | 14–4 |
| April 13 | South Dakota | George Cole Field | 4–0 | 31–6 | 14–4 |
| April 13 | South Dakota | George Cole Field | 7–0 | 32–6 | 14–4 |
| April 14 | South Dakota | George Cole Field | 7–1 | 33–6 | 14–4 |
| April 14 | South Dakota | George Cole Field | 8–1 | 34–6 | 14–4 |
| April 17 | at Oral Roberts | J. L. Johnson Stadium | 2–5 | 34–7 | 14–4 |
| April 20 | Houston | George Cole Field | 5–3 | 35–7 | 15–4 |
| April 21 | Houston | George Cole Field | 3–0 | 36–7 | 16–4 |
| April 21 | Houston | George Cole Field | 11–10 | 37–7 | 17–4 |
| April 27 | at Texas A&M | Olsen Field | 0–6 | 37–8 | 17–5 |
| April 28 | at Texas A&M | Olsen Field | 2–0 | 38–8 | 18–5 |
| April 28 | at Texas A&M | Olsen Field | 9–1 | 39–8 | 19–5 |

May (1–3)

| Date | Opponent | Stadium | Score | Overall Record | SWC Record |
|---|---|---|---|---|---|
| May | at Missouri Southern | Warren Turner Field | 8–9 | 39–9 | 19–5 |
| May | at Missouri Southern | Warren Turner Field | 6–5 | 40–9 | 19–5 |
| May | at Wichita State | Eck Stadium | 6–7 | 40–10 | 19–5 |
| May | at Wichita State | Eck Stadium | 4–5 | 40–11 | 19–5 |

Postseason
SWC Tournament (2–2)

| Date | Opponent | Site/stadium | Score | Overall record | SEC record |
|---|---|---|---|---|---|
| May 12 | vs Baylor | UFCU Disch–Falk Field | 6–1 | 41–11 | 19–5 |
| May 13 | at Texas | UFCU Disch–Falk Field | 2–6 | 41–12 | 19–5 |
| May 14 | vs Texas A&M | UFCU Disch–Falk Field | 6–2 | 42–12 | 19–5 |
| May 15 | at Texas | UFCU Disch–Falk Field | 6–12 | 42–13 | 19–5 |

East Regional (4–0)

| Date | Opponent | Site/stadium | Score | Overall record | SEC record |
|---|---|---|---|---|---|
| May 25 | George Washington | Tallahassee, FL | 12–11 | 43–13 | 19–5 |
| May 26 | Florida | Tallahassee, FL | 9–1 | 44–13 | 19–5 |
| May 27 | Delaware | Tallahassee, FL | 8–6 | 45–13 | 19–5 |
| May 28 | Delaware | Tallahassee, FL | 4–3 | 46–13 | 19–5 |

1979 College World Series (3–2)

| Date | Opponent | Site/stadium | Score | Overall record | SEC record |
|---|---|---|---|---|---|
| June 1 | vs Pepperdine | Johnny Rosenblatt Stadium | 5–4 | 47–13 | 19–5 |
| June 3 | vs Arizona | Johnny Rosenblatt Stadium | 10–3 | 48–13 | 19–5 |
| June 5 | vs Texas | Johnny Rosenblatt Stadium | 9–4 | 49–13 | 19–5 |
| June 6 | vs Cal State Fullerton | Johnny Rosenblatt Stadium | 10–13 | 49–14 | 19–5 |
| June 8 | vs Cal State Fullerton | Johnny Rosenblatt Stadium | 1–2 | 49–15 | 19–5 |

== Razorbacks in the 1979 MLB draft ==
The following members of the Arkansas Razorbacks baseball program were drafted in the 1979 Major League Baseball draft.

| Player | Position | Round | Overall | MLB team |
|---|---|---|---|---|
| Ronn Reynolds | C | 5th | 109th | Oakland Athletics |
| Johnny Ray | OF | 12th | 294th | Cleveland Indians |
