= 1979 Arizona Wildcats baseball team =

American college baseball season

1979 Arizona Wildcats baseball

Midwest Regional Champions Pacific-10 2nd Place Playoff Champions

College World Series
- Conference: Pacific-10 Conference
- CB: No. 5
- Record: 43–25 (17–13 Pac-10)
- Head coach: Jerry Kindall (7th season)
- Assistant coaches: Jerry Stitt (1st season); Jim Wing (7th season)
- Home stadium: Wildcat Field

1979 Pacific-10 Conference baseball standings
	Conf.				Overall
Team	W		L	PCT	W		L	PCT
Northern
No. 29 Washington State ^{x}‍‍‍	12	–	3	.800	40	–	10	.800
Washington ‍‍‍	11	–	5	.688	37	–	13	.740
Oregon State ‍‍‍	4	–	11	.267	21	–	19	.525
Oregon ‍‍‍	3	–	11	.214	14	–	27	.341
Southern
No. 9 UCLA ^{x}‍‍‍^{y}	21	–	9	.700	43	–	18	.705
No. 5 Arizona ‍‍‍^{y}	17	–	13	.567	43	–	25	.632
California ‍‍‍	16	–	14	.533	31	–	25	.554
Southern California ‍‍‍	15	–	15	.500	33	–	24	.579
Stanford ‍‍‍	13	–	17	.433	35	–	23	.603
Arizona State ‍‍‍	8	–	22	.267	32	–	31	.508
x – Division champion y – Invited to the NCAA tournament As of June 30, 1979; Rankings from Collegiate Baseball

The 1979 Arizona Wildcats baseball team represented the University of Arizona in the 1979 NCAA Division I baseball season. The Wildcats played their home games at Wildcat Field. The team was coached by Jerry Kindall in his 7th year at Arizona.

The Wildcats won the Midwest Regional to advance to the College World Series, where they were defeated by the Cal State Fullerton Titans.

== Personnel ==
=== Roster ===
1979 Arizona Wildcats baseball roster
• Wes Clements • Clark Crist • Michael Flinn • David Fortman • Terry Francona • Scott Green • Kendall Greene • Don Hyman • Bill Kinneberg • Ron Kirby	• Craig Lefferts • Ross McGehee • Steven Merrill • Brad Mills • Jeffrey Morris • John Moses • Virgel Overlund • Danny Powers • Ronald Quick • Alan Regier	• Randy Roeder • Pat Roessler • William Salzbrenner • Jay Sargent • Gary Schulz • Jim Scranton • Ron Sismondo • Scott Stanley • Robert Straley • Dwight Taylor

=== Coaches ===
1979 Arizona Wildcats baseball coaching staff
- Jerry Kindall - Head coach
- Jerry Stitt - Assistant coach
- Jim Wing - Assistant coach

== 1979 Schedule and results ==
1979 Arizona Wildcats baseball game log
Regular season
Date	Opponent	Site/Stadium	Score	Overall Record	Pac-10 Record
Feb 8	Cal State Fullerton	Wildcat Field • Tucson, AZ	L 7-9	0-1	
Feb 9	Cal State Fullerton	Wildcat Field • Tucson, AZ	L 0-9	0-2	
Feb 9	Cal State Fullerton	Wildcat Field • Tucson, AZ	L 4-8	0-3	
Feb 12	UC Santa Barbara	Wildcat Field • Tucson, AZ	W 11-10	1-3	
Feb 13	UC Santa Barbara	Wildcat Field • Tucson, AZ	W 13-10	2-3	
Feb 14	UC Santa Barbara	Wildcat Field • Tucson, AZ	W 15-7	3-3	
Feb 16	New Mexico	Wildcat Field • Tucson, AZ	W 10-5	4-3	
Feb 17	New Mexico	Wildcat Field • Tucson, AZ	W 6-4	5-3	
Feb 17	New Mexico	Wildcat Field • Tucson, AZ	W 16-4	6-3	
Feb 19	Lamar	Wildcat Field • Tucson, AZ	W 7-6	7-3	
Feb 20	Lamar	Wildcat Field • Tucson, AZ	W 5-4	8-3	
Feb 22	La Verne	Wildcat Field • Tucson, AZ	W 12-2	9-3	
Feb 23	La Verne	Wildcat Field • Tucson, AZ	W 9-2	10-3	
Feb 24	La Verne	Wildcat Field • Tucson, AZ	L 4-11	10-4	
Feb 26	Loyola Marymount	Titan Field • Fullerton, CA	L 3-5	10-5	
Feb 27	Loyola Marymount	Titan Field • Fullerton, CA	W 11-10	11-5	
Mar 1	Stanford	Wildcat Field • Tucson, AZ	W 6-5	12-5	1-0
Mar 3	Stanford	Wildcat Field • Tucson, AZ	L 7-9	12-6	1-1
Mar 4	Stanford	Wildcat Field • Tucson, AZ	W 15-6	13-6	2-1
Mar 5	Azusa Pacific	Wildcat Field • Tucson, AZ	W 12-9	14-6	
Mar 8	UCLA	Wildcat Field • Tucson, AZ	L 4-12	14-7	2-2
Mar 9	UCLA	Wildcat Field • Tucson, AZ	W 13-4	15-7	3-2
Mar 10	UCLA	Wildcat Field • Tucson, AZ	L 10-15	15-8	3-3
Mar 13	Colorado State	Wildcat Field • Tucson, AZ	W 10-6	16-8	
Mar 16	at USC	Dedeaux Field • Los Angeles, CA	L 4-5	16-9	3-4
Mar 17	at USC	Dedeaux Field • Los Angeles, CA	L 8-9	16-10	3-5
Mar 20	at Texas A&M	Olsen Field • College Station, TX	L 0-2	16-11	
Mar 20	at Texas A&M	Olsen Field • College Station, TX	W 9-3	17-11	
Mar 22	vs Minnesota	Disch-Falk Field • Austin, TX	L 3-5	17-12	
Mar 23	at Texas	Disch-Falk Field • Austin, TX	W 8-2	18-12	
Mar 23	at Texas	Disch-Falk Field • Austin, TX	W 7-4	19-12	
Mar 24	at Texas	Disch-Falk Field • Austin, TX	W 7-3	20-12	
Mar 24	at Texas	Disch-Falk Field • Austin, TX	L 0-4	20-13	
Mar 27	Colorado	Wildcat Field • Tucson, AZ	W 11-1	21-13	
Mar 30	at California	Evans Diamond • Berkeley, CA	L 0-2	21-14	3-6
Mar 31	at California	Evans Diamond • Berkeley, CA	W 6-3	22-14	4-6
Mar 31	at California	Evans Diamond • Berkeley, CA	L 4-8	22-15	4-7
Apr 5	Arizona State	Wildcat Field • Tucson, AZ	W 10-4	23-15	5-7
Apr 6	Arizona State	Wildcat Field • Tucson, AZ	W 12-9	24-15	6-7
Apr 7	Arizona State	Wildcat Field • Tucson, AZ	W 8-5	25-15	7-7
Apr 9	Grand Canyon	Wildcat Field • Tucson, AZ	W 12-5	26-15	
Apr 12	USC	Wildcat Field • Tucson, AZ	L 5-7	26-16	7-8
Apr 12	USC	Wildcat Field • Tucson, AZ	W 6-2	27-16	8-8
Apr 13	USC	Wildcat Field • Tucson, AZ	W 16-15	28-16	9-8
Apr 14	USC	Wildcat Field • Tucson, AZ	W 6-5	29-16	10-8
Apr 20	at Stanford	Sunken Diamond • Palo Alto, CA	L 7-13	29-17	10-9
Apr 21	at Stanford	Sunken Diamond • Palo Alto, CA	L 4-13	29-18	10-10
Apr 22	at Stanford	Sunken Diamond • Palo Alto, CA	W 8-6	30-18	11-10
Apr 24	Northern Arizona	Wildcat Field • Tucson, AZ	L 5-6	30-19	
Apr 24	Northern Arizona	Wildcat Field • Tucson, AZ	W 11-4	31-19	
Apr 27	at UCLA	Sawtelle Field • Los Angeles, CA	L 1-13	31-20	11-11
Apr 28	at UCLA	Sawtelle Field • Los Angeles, CA	L 6-12	31-21	11-12
Apr 28	at UCLA	Sawtelle Field • Los Angeles, CA	W 6-5	32-21	12-12
May 3	California	Wildcat Field • Tucson, AZ	L 9-15	32-22	12-13
May 4	California	Wildcat Field • Tucson, AZ	W 6-5	33-22	13-13
May 5	California	Wildcat Field • Tucson, AZ	W 19-18	34-22	14-13
May 10	at Arizona State	Packard Stadium • Tempe, AZ	W 12-1	35-22	15-13
May 11	at Arizona State	Packard Stadium • Tempe, AZ	W 9-6	36-22	16-13
May 12	at Arizona State	Packard Stadium • Tempe, AZ	W 6-4	37-22	17-13
Pacific-10 Conference 2nd Place Playoffs
May 22	Washington State	Bailey Field • Pullman, WA	W 9-7	38-22	
May 23	Washington State	Bailey Field • Pullman, WA	L 8-9	38-23	
May 24	Washington State	Bailey Field • Pullman, WA	W 22-14	39-23	
NCAA Midwest Regional
May 22	Oklahoma	Wildcat Field • Tucson, AZ	W 8-1	40-23	
May 23	Hawaii	Wildcat Field • Tucson, AZ	W 10-2	41-23	
May 24	Hawaii	Wildcat Field • Tucson, AZ	W 5-3	42-23	
College World Series
Jun 1	vs Miami (FL)	Johnny Rosenblatt Stadium • Omaha, NE	W 5-1	43-23	
Jun 3	vs Arkansas	Johnny Rosenblatt Stadium • Omaha, NE	L 3-10	43-24	
Jun 4	vs Cal State Fullerton	Johnny Rosenblatt Stadium • Omaha, NE	L 3-16	43-25	

=== Midwest Regional ===
Midwest Regional Teams
Arizona Wildcats	Oklahoma Sooners	Hawaii Rainbow Warriors	Indiana State Sycamores

== College World Series ==
1979 College World Series Teams
Arizona Wildcats	Arkansas Razorbacks	Cal State Fullerton Titans	Connecticut Huskies	Miami Hurricanes	Mississippi State Bulldogs	Pepperdine Waves	Texas Longhorns

Upper round 1
Arkansas	5
Pepperdine	4
Arizona	5
Miami (FL)	1
Texas	11
Connecticut	5
Mississippi State	6
Cal State Fullerton	1

Upper round 2
Arkansas	10
Arizona	3
Texas	8
Mississippi State	2
Lower round 1
Pepperdine	9
Miami (FL)	3
Connecticut	3
Cal State Fullerton	8

Upper final
Arkansas	9
Texas	4
Lower round 2
Mississippi State	4
Pepperdine	5^{10}
Arizona	3
Cal State Fullerton	16

Semifinals
Arkansas	10
Cal State Fullerton	13
Texas	4
Pepperdine	6

Preliminary final
Cal State Fullerton	8
Pepperdine	5

Final
Cal State Fullerton	2
Arkansas	1

== Awards and honors ==
Clark Crist

- All-Pac-10 South Division

Terry Francona

- All-Pac-10 South Division

Craig Lefferts

- All-Pac-10 South Division

Brad Mills

- All-Pac-10 South Division

== 1979 MLB Draft ==
Player	Position	Round	Overall	MLB team
Craig Lefferts	LHP	7	177	Kansas City Royals
Brad Mills	INF	17	426	Montreal Expos
Wes Clements	OF	38	848	Chicago Cubs
