= Augie Garrido =

American baseball coach (1939–2018)

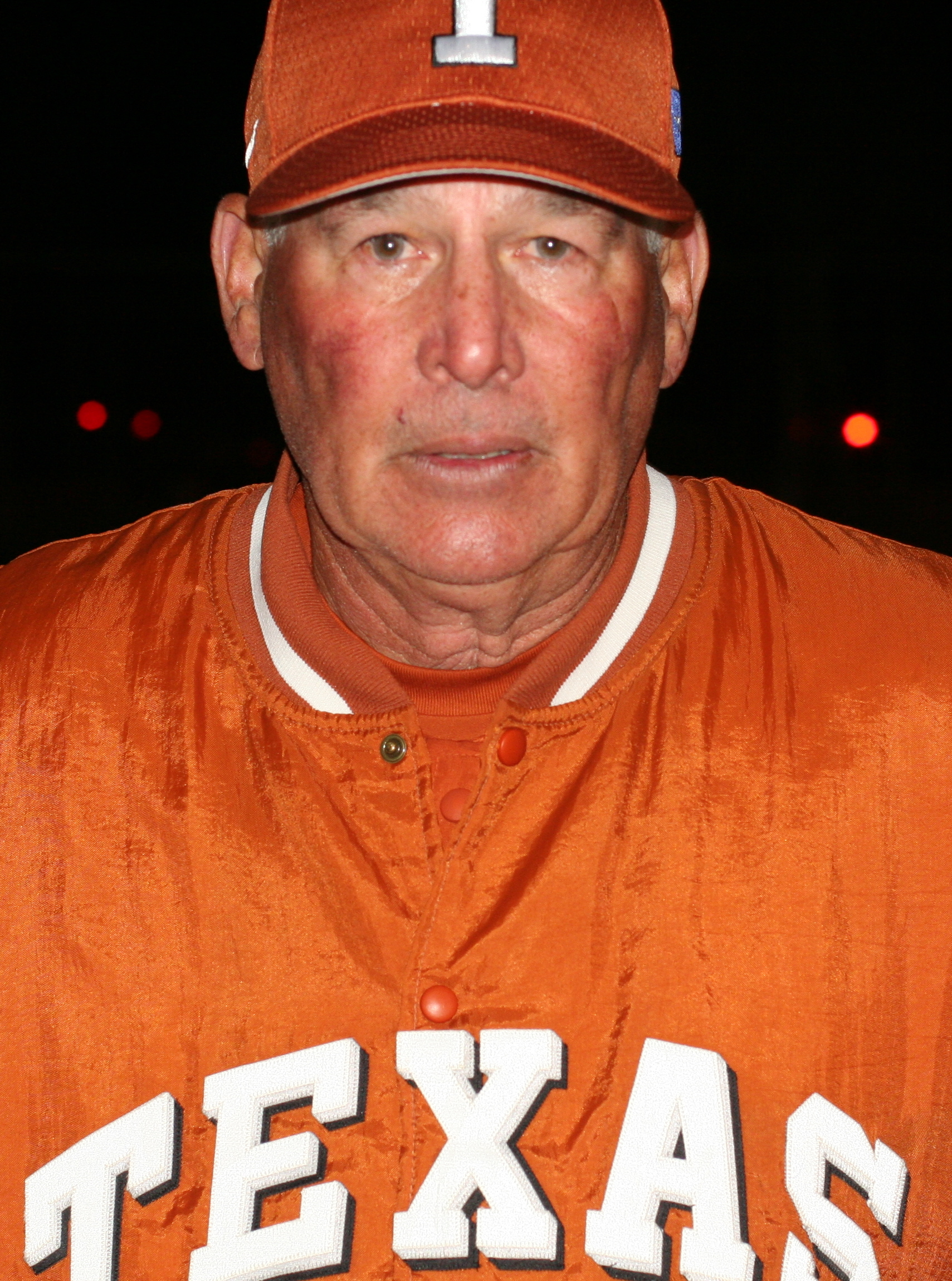
- Garrido in 2007

Biographical details
- Born: February 6, 1939; Vallejo, California, U.S.
- Died: March 15, 2018 (aged 79); Newport Beach, California, U.S.

Playing career
- 1959–1961: Fresno State
- Position: Outfielder

Coaching career (HC unless noted)
- 1967–1968: Sierra HS
- 1969: San Francisco State
- 1970–1972: Cal Poly
- 1973–1987: Cal State Fullerton
- 1988–1990: Illinois
- 1991–1996: Cal State Fullerton
- 1997–2016: Texas

Head coaching record
- Overall: 1,975–951–9 (college)
- Tournaments: 139–71 (NCAA D-I and D-II)

Accomplishments and honors

Championships
- 5× College World Series (1979, 1984, 1995, 2002, 2005); CCAA regular season (1974); 4× PCAA/Big West regular season (1975, 1976, 1991, 1995); PCAA South Division (1985); 2× Big Ten tournament (1989, 1990); 5× Big 12 tournament (2002, 2003, 2008, 2009, 2015); 7× Big 12 regular season (2002, 2004, 2006, 2007, 2009, 2010, 2011)

Awards
- 2× The Sporting News College Coach of the Year (1975, 1979); 2× Baseball America College Coach of the Year (1984, 2002); 4× Collegiate Baseball Coach of the Year (1984, 1995, 2002, 2005); Big West Coach of the Year (1987); 6× Big 12 Coach of the Year (2002, 2004, 2006, 2007, 2010, 2011)
- College Baseball Hall of Fame; Inducted in 2016

August Edmun Garrido Jr. (February 6, 1939 – March 15, 2018) was an American professional baseball player and coach in NCAA Division I college baseball, best known for his stints with the Cal State Fullerton Titans and Texas Longhorns.

Garrido compiled a collegiate record of 1,975–951–9 and retired in 2016 as the coach with, at the time, the most wins in college baseball history. His win total was surpassed by Mike Martin of the Florida State Seminoles in 2018. He took his programs to 15 College World Series, winning five of them: three with Cal State Fullerton and two with Texas.

He is often considered the greatest coach in college baseball history.

== Early life and education ==
Garrido was born in Vallejo, California in 1939 and graduated from Vallejo High School in 1957. From 1959 to 1961, Garrido played college baseball for Fresno State. Garrido played minor league baseball in the Cleveland Indians organization from 1961 to 1965, beginning with the Class B Burlington Indians from 1961 to 1962, followed by the double-A Charleston Indians in 1963 and triple-A Portland Beavers from 1964 to 1965.

After playing for the semi-pro Eureka-Humboldt Crabs in 1966, with Mark Marquess among his teammates, Garrido began graduate studies at California Polytechnic State University, San Luis Obispo (Cal Poly) and graduated in 1968 with a master's degree in education. During his graduate studies, Garrido coached baseball at Sierra High School in Tollhouse, California in 1967 and 1968.

== Coaching career ==
=== San Francisco State (1969) ===
In 1969, Garrido began his coaching career as head coach at San Francisco State, where he led the Gators to a 25–14 record.

=== Cal Poly (1970–1972) ===
Returning to Cal Poly, Garrido was head coach for the Cal Poly Mustangs from 1970 to 1972, during which he went 86–62–1. He turned around the Mustangs from a 16–33 record in 1970 to 39–11–1 in 1971.

=== Cal State Fullerton (1973–1987 and 1991–1996) ===
From 1973 to 1987 and again from 1991 to 1996, Garrido was head coach at Cal State Fullerton. In 21 seasons with Cal State Fullerton, Garrido accumulated a 929–391–6 record with seven College World Series including three championships (1979, 1984, and 1995) and a runner-up finish in 1992. The Sporting News named Garrido the College Baseball Coach of the Year in 1975 and 1979.

=== Illinois (1988–1990) ===
In between his two stints at Cal State Fullerton, Garrido was head coach at Illinois from 1988 to 1990. Illinois athletic director Neale Stoner signed Garrido to a salary nearly double that of other non-revenue sports' coaches at Illinois.

In 1989, Illinois got its first Big Ten tournament title and NCAA tournament appearance since 1963 and repeated both achievements in 1990. Illinois went 111–57 under Garrido.

=== Texas (1997–2016) ===
Garrido led Texas to the College World Series four straight years from 2002 to 2005 winning the tournament in 2002 and 2005 and finishing runner-up to his former team, Cal State Fullerton, in 2004. In 2006, despite being ranked No. 3 in the nation at the end of the regular season, Texas was defeated at home in an NCAA regional by Stanford.

On April 29, 2011, Garrido became the first NCAA Division I coach to reach 1,800 victories as the seventh-ranked Longhorns defeated No. 14 Oklahoma 5–0 in front of 7,339 fans at UFCU Disch–Falk Field.

In 2016, Texas had its first losing season since 1998, and the team did not qualify for postseason play for the third time in five years. On May 30, 2016, the University of Texas announced that Garrido had resigned and accepted a position as a special assistant to the athletic director, Mike Perrin. His record at Texas was 824–427–2.

=== Legacy ===
Garrido's teams won five national titles (1979, 1984, 1995, 2002, 2005). He is one of only two coaches, along with Andy Lopez, to lead teams from more than one school (Cal State Fullerton and Texas) to national titles, and is among the most successful college baseball coaches in history. He is the first coach to guide teams to national championships in four different decades.

Additionally, Garrido earned 15 trips to the College World Series, including eight at Texas, while garnering National Coach of the Year honors five times (1975, 1979, 1984, 1985, 2002), regional coach of the year accolades following six different seasons (1975, 1979, 1984, 1985, 2002, 2004) and conference coach of the year distinctions on three occasions (1987, 1995, 2002). Garrido's teams won league championships in 20 different seasons.

His final coaching record was 1,975–951–9. He earned more wins than any other coach in NCAA baseball history, across all levels, prior to being surpassed by Florida State University's Mike Martin in 2018.

== Personal life ==
Garrido was a friend of actor Kevin Costner from Garrido's days at CSUF (where Costner attended and was cut from the baseball team by Garrido). Costner, who maintains a home in Austin, was occasionally seen at Garrido's practices and games. Garrido played the New York Yankees manager in Costner's movie "For Love of the Game."

Garrido was a friend of director Richard Linklater, a Longhorn fan. Linklater was often seen taking batting practice with the team while in Austin. In 2008, ESPN2 aired a 2-hour documentary directed by Linklater, titled "Inning By Inning: Portrait of A Coach", which focused on the life of Garrido, from his childhood to his current job at The University of Texas.

American storyteller and adventurer Woodrow Landfair was a player of Garrido's at the University of Texas from 2003 to 2005, serving as the team's bullpen catcher and winning back-to-back Teammate of the Year awards in 2004 and 2005. In a 2007 article in the Austin American-Statesman, Landfair was quoted praising Garrido as both a baseball and a life coach. Landfair claims that Garrido inspired him to pursue a writing career when, after Landfair accepted the team's 2005 National Championship trophy, Garrido told him, "Let this be only your first great accomplishment."

On January 17, 2009, Garrido was arrested by Austin police for driving while intoxicated. Police reported that Garrido was driving a Porsche Cayenne west on 6th Street at about 1:00 a.m., when a DWI enforcement officer pulled the coach over since he did not have his headlights on. After taking a sobriety test, Garrido admitted to the officer that he consumed five glasses of wine and was intoxicated. The school suspended him with pay from the first four games of the Longhorns' 2009 season. Garrido publicly apologized, calling his misdemeanor a "serious mistake". He pleaded guilty to the charge on February 2, 2009, and was sentenced on April 30, 2009.

Garrido was a friend of former president George W. Bush from the time Bush was a part owner of the Texas Rangers baseball team.

Garrido's curse-laden post game rants became the subject of several YouTube videos.

On March 12, 2018, Garrido suffered a stroke. Three days later, he died at the age of 79 in California.

== Head coaching record ==
The following is a table of Garrido's win–loss records as an NCAA head baseball coach.

Statistics overview
Season	Team	Overall	Conference	Standing	Postseason
San Francisco State Gators (Far West Conference) (1969)
1969	San Francisco State	25–14			
San Francisco State:		25–14			
Cal Poly Mustangs (California Collegiate Athletic Association) (1970–1972)
1970	Cal Poly	15–33	10–11		
1971	Cal Poly	39–11–1	15–5		
1972	Cal Poly	31–18	15–9		
Cal Poly:		86–62–1 (.581)	40–25 (.615)		
Cal State Fullerton Titans (California Collegiate Athletic Association) (1973–1974)
1973	Cal State Fullerton	19–33–1			
1974	Cal State Fullerton	37–17	16–6	1st	NCAA D-II Regional
Cal State Fullerton Titans (Pacific Coast Athletic Association) (1975–1977)
1975	Cal State Fullerton	36–14–1	14–7	1st	College World Series
1976	Cal State Fullerton	48–15	17–4	1st	NCAA Regional
Cal State Fullerton Titans (Southern California Baseball Association) (1977–1984)
1977	Cal State Fullerton	44–14	17–7	T–1st	NCAA Regional
1978	Cal State Fullerton	44–14	24–4	1st	NCAA Regional
1979	Cal State Fullerton	60–14	23–4	1st	College World Series champions
1980	Cal State Fullerton	49–18	20–8	1st	NCAA Regional
1981	Cal State Fullerton	48–17	22–6	1st	NCAA Regional
1982	Cal State Fullerton	51–23	23–5	1st	College World Series
1983	Cal State Fullerton	50–21	22–6	T–1st	NCAA Regional
1984	Cal State Fullerton	66–20	22–6	1st	College World Series champions
Cal State Fullerton Titans (Pacific Coast Athletic Association) (1985–1987)
1985	Cal State Fullerton	36–22–1	21–9	1st (South)	
1986	Cal State Fullerton	36–21	12–9	T–3rd	
1987	Cal State Fullerton	44–17	18–3	1st	NCAA Regional
Cal State Fullerton (1973–1987):		665–292–6 (.694)	271–84		
Illinois Fighting Illini (Big Ten Conference) (1988–1990)
1988	Illinois	26–20	12–16	7th	
1989	Illinois	42–16	17–11	T–2nd	NCAA Regional
1990	Illinois	43–21	19–9	T–2nd	NCAA Regional
Illinois:		111–57 (.661)	48–36 (.571)		
Cal State Fullerton Titans (Big West Conference) (1991–1996)
1991	Cal State Fullerton	34–22	15–6	T–1st	
1992	Cal State Fullerton	46–17	17–7	2nd	College World Series Runner-up
1993	Cal State Fullerton	35–19	16–5	2nd	NCAA Regional
1994	Cal State Fullerton	47–16	15–5	3rd	College World Series
1995	Cal State Fullerton	57–9	18–3	1st	College World Series champions
1996	Cal State Fullerton	45–16	13–8	4th	NCAA Regional
Cal State Fullerton (1991–1996):		264–99 (.727)	94–34 (.734)		
Texas Longhorns (Big 12 Conference) (1997–2016)
1997	Texas	29–22	12–15	7th	
1998	Texas	23–32–1	11–18	8th	
1999	Texas	36–26	17–13	6th	NCAA Regional
2000	Texas	46–21	19–10	4th	College World Series
2001	Texas	36–26	19–11	3rd	NCAA Regional
2002	Texas	57–15	19–8	1st	College World Series champions
2003	Texas	50–20	19–8	T–2nd	College World Series
2004	Texas	58–15	19–7	1st	College World Series Runner–up
2005	Texas	56–16	16–10	3rd	College World Series champions
2006	Texas	41–21	19–7	1st	NCAA Regional
2007	Texas	46–17	21–6	1st	NCAA Regional
2008	Texas	39–22	15–12	5th	NCAA Regional
2009	Texas	50–16–1	17–9–1	1st	College World Series Runner–up
2010	Texas	50–13	24–3	1st	NCAA Super Regional
2011	Texas	49–19	19–8	T–1st	College World Series
2012	Texas	30–22	14–10	3rd	
2013	Texas	27–24	7–17	9th	
2014	Texas	43–19	13–11	5th	College World Series
2015	Texas	30–27	11–13	5th	NCAA Regional
2016	Texas	25–32	10–14	T–6th	
Texas:		824–427–2 (.658)	321–210–1 (.604)		
Total:		1,975–951–9 (.674)			
National champion Postseason invitational champion Conference regular season champion Conference regular season and conference tournament champion Division regular season champion Division regular season and conference tournament champion Conference tournament champion

== See also ==
- List of college baseball career coaching wins leaders
