= 1979 Cal State Fullerton Titans baseball team =

American college baseball season

1979 Cal State Fullerton Titans baseball

College World Series champions SCBA Champions
- Conference: Southern California Baseball Association
- CB: No. 1
- Record: 60–14–1 (23–4–1 SCBA)
- Head coach: Augie Garrido (7th year)
- Assistant coaches: Jody Robinson (3rd year); Matt McCann (1st year); Bill Kernen (2nd year)
- Home stadium: Titan Field

1979 Southern California Baseball Association standings
	Conf.				Overall
Team	W		L	PCT	W		L	PCT
No. 1 Cal State Fullerton ‍†‍‍^{y}	23	–	4	.852	60	–	14	.811
No. 3 Pepperdine ‍‍‍^{y}	19	–	9	.679	47	–	16	.746
Long Beach State ‍‍‍	17	–	10	.630	40	–	22	.645
San Diego ‍‍‍	14	–	12	.538	32	–	19	.627
Loyola Marymount ‍‍‍	12	–	16	.429	29	–	34	.460
Cal State Los Angeles ‍‍‍	9	–	19	.321	25	–	39	.391
UC Irvine ‍‍‍	8	–	19	.296	22	–	37	.373
UC Santa Barbara ‍‍‍	7	–	20	.259	17	–	31	.354
† – Conference champion y – Invited to the NCAA tournament As of June 30, 1979; Rankings from Collegiate Baseball

The 1979 Cal State Fullerton Titans baseball team represented California State University, Fullerton in the 1979 NCAA Division I baseball season. The Titans played their home games at Titan Field. The team was coached by Augie Garrido in his 7th season at Cal State Fullerton.

The Titans won the College World Series, defeating the Arkansas Razorbacks in the championship game.

== Roster ==
1979 Cal State Fullerton Titans roster
Pitchers: 6 Bruce Davis - Junior; 7 Pat Estrada - Junior; 18 Frank Ferroni - Sophomore; 19 Dave Weatherman - Sophomore; 20 Tony Hudson - Sophomore; 22 Tim Miner - Sophomore; 26 Ray Lane - Junior; 27 Jim Sutton - Sophomore; 30 Larry Navilhon - Junior	Infielders: 3 Sam Favata - Sophomore; 8 Mike Garcia - Senior; 9 Matt Vejar - Junior; 13 Glenn Robertson - Junior; 15 Dan Hanggie - Sophomore; 29 Tim Wallach - Senior; Catchers: 14 Kurt Kingsolver - Junior; 24 Jerald Traylor - Sophomore; 25 Joe Martelli - Senior; 28 Mike Rubel - Freshman; 31 Scott Desrosier - Senior	Outfielders: 1 Andre David - Junior; 2 Bobby Smith - Junior; 5 Bobby Garrett - Senior; 10 Mickey Palmer - Junior; 12 John Christensen - Freshman; Coaches: 16 Augie Garrido - 7th Season; 4 Jody Robinson - 3rd Season; 11 Matt McCann - 1st Season; 17 Bill Kernen - 2nd Season

== Schedule ==
1979 Cal State Fullerton Titans baseball game log
Regular season
February

Date	Opponent	Score	Overall record	SCBA record
February 5	Southern California	13–6	1–0	–
February 8	Arizona	9–7	2–0	–
February 9	at Arizona	9–0	3–0	–
February 9	at Arizona	8–4	4–0	–
February 14	at Cal Poly Pomona	2–4	4–1	–
February 16	California	4–1	5–1	–
February 17	California	5–4	6–1	–
February 17	California	7–6	7–1	–
February 20	Chapman	5–3	8–1	–
February 23	at Arizona State	4–5	8–2	–
February 24	at Arizona State	3–10	8–3	–
February 24	at Arizona State	18–12	9–3	–
February 27	UCLA	9–2	10–3	–
February 28	Biola	4–2	11–3	–

March

Date	Opponent	Score	Overall record	SCBA record
March 4	Cal State Dominguez Hills	3–1	12–3	–
March 6	at Cal Poly Pomona	13–6	13–3	–
March 6	at La Verne	6–9	13–4	–
March 8	UNLV	4–2	14–4	–
March 9	UNLV	12–0	15–4	–
March 10	at San Diego State	13–6	16–4	–
March 10	at San Diego State	10–3	17–4	–
March 11	at San Diego State	10–4	18–4	–
March 14	So. California College	15–0	19–4	–
March 16	New Mexico	10–6	20–4	–
March 17	New Mexico	2–5	20–5	–
March 17	New Mexico	4–1	21–5	–
March 22	at Chapman	11–3	22–5	–
March 23	Azusa Pacific	7–6	23–5	–
March 24	Stanford	8–3	24–5	–
March 24	Stanford	2–3	24–6	–
March 30	UC Irvine	1–0	25–6	1–0
March 31	at UC Irvine	8–6	26–6	2–0
March 31	at UC Irvine	7–3	27–6	3–0

April

Date	Opponent	Score	Overall record	SCBA record
April 3	UC Santa Barbara	5–1	28–6	4–0
April 6	San Diego	11–11	28–6–1	4–0–1
April 7	at San Diego	10–3	29–6–1	5–0–1
April 7	at San Diego	8–2	30–6–1	6–0–1
April 8	at Loyola Marymount	2–1	31–6–1	7–0–1
April 12	vs. UC Irvine	16–2	32–6–1	–
April 13	vs. Chapman	4–13	32–7–1	–
April 13	vs. UC Irvine	11–2	33–7–1	–
April 14	vs. Chapman	5–2	34–7–1	–
April 14	vs. Chapman	5–6	34–8–1	–
April 17	Cal State LA	12–6	35–8–1	7–2–1
April 20	Pepperdine	3–5	35–9–1	7–1–1
April 21	at Pepperdine	9–10	35–10–1	8–2–1
April 21	Pepperdine	8–7	36–10–1	9–2–1
April 22	Hawaii	12–4	37–10–1	–
April 24	San Diego	7–2	38–10–1	10–2–1
April 27	at Long Beach State	6–9	38–11–1	10–3–1
April 28	Long Beach State	7–1	39–11–1	11–3–1
April 28	Long Beach State	5–3	40–11–1	12–3–1

May

Date	Opponent	Score	Overall record	SCBA record
May 1	Pepperdine	8–2	41–11–1	13–3–1
May 4	at Cal State LA	9–0	42–11–1	14–3–1
May 5	Cal State LA	8–3	43–11–1	15–3–1
May 5	Cal State LA	4–2	44–11–1	16–3–1
May 8	UC Irvine	10–6	45–11–1	17–3–1
May 11	UC Santa Barbara	21–2	46–11–1	18–3–1
May 12	at UC Santa Barbara	14–2	47–11–1	19–3–1
May 12	at UC Santa Barbara	18–0	48–11–1	20–3–1
May 15	at Long Beach State	10–5	49–11–1	21–3–1
May 18	at Loyola Marymount	17–6	50–11–1	22–3–1
May 19	at Loyola Marymount	7–4	51–11–1	23–3–1
May 19	at Loyola Marymount	3–5	51–12–1	23–4–1

Post-season
NCAA tournament: West Regional

Date	Opponent	Site/stadium	Score	Cal State Fullerton Decision	Attendance	Overall record
May 25	vs. UCLA	Pete Beiden Field	4–5	Hudson (L; 9–4)	384	51–13–1
May 26	vs. Portland	Pete Beiden Field	20–3	Weatherman (W; 13–2)	–	52–13–1
May 27	vs. Fresno State	Pete Beiden Field	12–3	Sutton (W; 8–2)	513	53–13–1
May 27	vs. UCLA	Pete Beiden Field	9–2	Hudson (W; 10–4)	420	54–13–1
May 28	vs. UCLA	Pete Beiden Field	9–5	Navilhon (W; 14–0)	392	55–13–1

NCAA tournament: College World Series

Date	Opponent	Site/stadium	Score	Cal State Fullerton Decision	Attendance	Overall record
June 2	vs. Mississippi State	Rosenblatt Stadium	1–6	Navilhon (L; 14–1)	11,047	55–14–1
June 3	vs. Connecticut	Rosenblatt Stadium	8–3	Weatherman (W; 14–2)	3,813	56–14–1
June 4	vs. Arizona	Rosenblatt Stadium	16–3	Sutton (W; 9–2)	–	57–14–1
June 6	vs. Arkansas	Rosenblatt Stadium	13–10	Estrada (W; 3–0)	9,091	58–14–1
June 7	vs. Pepperdine	Rosenblatt Stadium	8–5	Sutton (W; 10–2)	9,299	59–14–1
June 8	vs. Arkansas	Rosenblatt Stadium	2–1	Weatherman (W; 15–2)	10,158	60–14–1

== Awards and honors ==
Dan Hanggie

- All-America Second Team
- College World Series All-Tournament Team
- All-SCBA First Team

Sam Favata

- All-SCBA First Team

Tony Hudson

- College World Series Most Outstanding Player
- College World Series All-Tournament Team

Kurt Kingsolver

- College World Series All-Tournament Team

Larry Navilhon

- All-SCBA First Team

Matt Vejar

- College World Series All-Tournament Team

Tim Wallach

- Golden Spikes Award
- The Sporting News Player of the Year
- All-America First Team
- College World Series All-Tournament Team
- SCBA Player of the Year
- All-SCBA First Team

Dave Weatherman

- All-SCBA First Team

== Titans in the 1979 MLB draft ==
The following members of the Cal State Fullerton Titans baseball program were drafted in the 1979 Major League Baseball draft.

Player	Position	Round	Overall	MLB team
Tim Wallach	1B	1st	10th	Montreal Expos
Michael Palmer	OF	5th	125th	Kansas City Royals
Larry Navilhon	RHP	12th	300th	San Diego Padres
Andre David	OF	14th	349th	Minnesota Twins
Kurt Kingsolver	C	16th	413th	Milwaukee Brewers
Tony Hudson	RHP	17th	422nd	St. Louis Cardinals
Mike Garcia	2B	27th	669th	Atlanta Braves
