= 1979 Southwest Conference baseball tournament =

- Teams: 4
- Format: Double-elimination tournament
- Finals site: Disch–Falk Field; Austin, TX
- Champions: Texas (1st title)
- Winning coach: Cliff Gustafson (1st title)

1979 Southwest Conference baseball standings
	Conf.				Overall
Team	W		L	PCT	W		L	PCT
No. 4 Texas ‍†‍‡‍^{y}	22	–	2	.917	61	–	8	.884
No. 2 Arkansas ‍‍‍^{y}	19	–	5	.792	49	–	15	.766
Baylor ‍‍‍	13	–	9	.591	34	–	15	.694
Texas A&M ‍‍‍	13	–	10	.565	30	–	20	.600
Houston ‍‍‍	11	–	13	.458	27	–	17	.614
Texas Tech ‍‍‍	9	–	15	.375	16	–	23	.410
Southern Methodist ‍‍‍	7	–	16	.304	21	–	26	.447
Texas Christian ‍‍‍	7	–	17	.292	21	–	24	.467
Rice ‍‍‍	5	–	19	.208	20	–	29	.408
† – Conference champion ‡ – Tournament champion y – Invited to the NCAA tournament As of June 30, 1979; Rankings from Collegiate Baseball

The 1979 Southwest Conference baseball tournament was the league's annual postseason tournament used to determine the Southwest Conference's (SWC) automatic bid to the 1979 NCAA Division I baseball tournament. The tournament was held from May 12 through 14 at Disch–Falk Field on the campus of The University of Texas in Austin, Texas.

The number 1 seed Texas Longhorns went 3–0 to win the team's first SWC tournament under head coach Cliff Gustafson.

== Format and seeding ==
The tournament featured the top four finishers of the SWC's 9 teams in a double-elimination tournament.

Place	Team	Conference				Overall			Seed
Place	Team	W	L	%	GB	W	L	%	Seed
1	Texas	22	2	.917	-	55	8	.873	1
2	Arkansas	19	5	.792	3	49	15	.766	2
3	Baylor	13	9	.591	8	34	15	.694	3
4	Texas A&M	13	10	.565	8.5	30	20	.600	4
5	Houston	11	13	.458	11	27	17	.614	-
6	Texas Tech	9	15	.375	13	16	23	.410	-
7	SMU	7	16	.304	14.5	21	26	.447	-
8	TCU	7	17	.292	15	21	24	.467	-
9	Rice	5	19	.208	17	20	29	.408	-

== Tournament ==
Upper round 1
1	Texas	6
4	Texas A&M	4
2	Arkansas	6
3	Baylor	1
Lower round 1
4	Texas A&M	2
3	Baylor	1

Upper final
1	Texas	6
2	Arkansas	2
Lower final
2	Arkansas	6
4	Texas A&M	2

Final
1	Texas	12	–
2	Arkansas	6	–
