= 1979 Eastern 8 Conference baseball tournament =

American college baseball tournament

- Teams: 6
- Finals site: Hershey, Pennsylvania
- Champions: George Washington (1st title)
- Winning coach: Mike Toomey (1st title)

The 1979 Eastern 8 Conference baseball tournament was a postseason baseball tournament for the Eastern 8 Conference in the 1979 NCAA Division I baseball season. The first iteration of the event took place from April 20–21, 1979 and was held Hershey High School and Lower Dauphin High School in Hershey, Pennsylvania. George Washington earned the first championship and the conference's automatic bid to the 1979 NCAA Division I baseball tournament.

== Format ==
The tournament followed a double-elimination format, with two teams (George Washington and Duquesne) receiving first round byes.

== Bracket ==
Quarterfinals
Penn State	4
Rutgers	3
Pittsburgh	3
West Virginia	2

Second Round
George Washington	4
Penn State	3
Duquesne	3
Pittsburgh	12

Championship Game
George Washington	7
Pittsburgh	3

Two games were scheduled to determine place of finish. West Virginia beat Rutgers 13-10 to finish 5th while Penn State won by forfeit over Duquesne to win 3rd.
