= 1979 NCAA Division I baseball rankings =

1979 NCAA Division I baseball season

Tournament

College World Series
- Champions: Cal State Fullerton
- Runners-up: Arkansas
- MOP: Tony Hudson (Cal State Fullerton)

Seasons
- ← 1978 1980 →

The following poll makes up the 1979 NCAA Division I baseball rankings. Collegiate Baseball Newspaper published its first human poll of the top 20 teams in college baseball in 1957, and expanded to rank the top 30 teams in 1961.

== Collegiate Baseball ==
Currently, only the final poll from the 1979 season is available.

Rank	Team
1	Cal State Fullerton
2	Arkansas
3	Pepperdine
4	Texas
5	Arizona
6	Mississippi State
7	Miami (FL)
8	Connecticut
9	UCLA
10	Clemson
11	Hawaii
12	Delaware
13	Georgia Southern
14	BYU
15	Lamar
16	San Diego State
17	Murray State
18	Indiana State
19	Florida
20	Tulane
21	Southern Illinois
22	New Orleans
23	Texas–Pan American
24	Michigan State
25	Oklahoma
26	Fresno State
27	Florida State
28	St. John's
29	Washington State
30	Navy
