= Norm DeBriyn =

American baseball coach (born 1942)

Biographical details
- Born: November 1, 1941 (age 85); Ashland, Wisconsin, U.S.
- Education: Wisconsin–Oshkosh ('63)

Coaching career (HC unless noted)
- 1970–2002: Arkansas

Head coaching record
- Overall: 1,161–650–6 (.641)

Accomplishments and honors

Championships
- 1979 College World Series Runner-Up; 1985 Southwest Conference Tournament; 1987, 1989 Southwest Conference regular season 1999 Southeastern Conference regular season 1999 Southeastern Conference Western Division

Awards
- SWC Coach of the Year, 1978, 1982, 1983, 1987, 1989, 1990; SEC Coach of the year, 1999; American Baseball Coaches Association Hall of Fame; Arkansas Sports Hall of Fame; Razorback Hall of Fame; Wisconsin–Oshkosh Hall of Fame; 15 NCAA Tournament appearances 4 College World Series appearances

Records
- Winningest coach in Arkansas baseball history

Norm DeBriyn (born November 1, 1941) is an American former baseball coach at the University of Arkansas. He led the Arkansas Razorbacks baseball team for 33 years, beginning in 1970. During his tenure, which ended after the 2002 season, DeBriyn's teams achieved three conference championships, 15 NCAA tournament appearances, and four College World Series. His Razorbacks fell two runs short of winning the 1979 College World Series.

When DeBriyn retired in 2002, his record of 1,161–650–6 (.641) was the fourteenth-best all-time in college baseball.

== Personal life ==
DeBriyn is a native of Ashland, Wisconsin, and graduated from the University of Wisconsin–Oshkosh with a B.S. in history in 1963. He currently resides in Fayetteville, Arkansas, home of the Razorbacks.

DeBriyn is a Roman Catholic Deacon for the Catholic Church in Arkansas. He was ordained on November 17, 2012.

== Team accomplishments ==
Under DeBriyn, Arkansas won three conference championships, appeared in fifteen NCAA tournaments, and four College World Series. Before DeBriyn, Arkansas had never played in an NCAA tournament. He also coached several future MLB stars, including Eric Hinske, Tom Pagnozzi, Kevin McReynolds, and Cliff Lee, winner of the Cy Young Award for 2008. DeBriyn was also instrumental to building the program as a whole, beginning with practices at the fairgrounds and retiring in Baum Stadium, one of the United States's premiere college baseball facilities. His former player, Dave Van Horn, took over as head coach after DeBriyn retired following the 2002 season.

== Head coaching record ==
Arkansas Razorbacks baseball under Norm DeBriyn
| Year | School | Overall Record | Conference Record | Notes |
| 1970 | Arkansas | 19-13 | | |
| 1971 | Arkansas | 23-18-1 | | |
| 1972 | Arkansas | 16-16 | | |
| 1973 | Arkansas | 23-7-1 | NCAA Tournament Appearance | |
| 1974 | Arkansas | 22-21 | 9-15 | |
| 1975 | Arkansas | 20-22 | 8-14 | |
| 1976 | Arkansas | 31-15-1 | 12-12 | |
| 1977 | Arkansas | 33-18 | 14-10 | |
| 1978 | Arkansas | 31-13 | 18-6 | |
| 1979 | Arkansas | 49-15 | 19-5 | SWC Tournament runner-up NCAA Tournament Appearance; CWS Runner-up |
| 1980 | Arkansas | 44-22 | 15-8 | NCAA Tournament Appearance |
| 1981 | Arkansas | 31-21 | 12-9 | |
| 1982 | Arkansas | 40-15-2 | 13-8 | |
| 1983 | Arkansas | 44-21 | 13-8 | NCAA Tournament Appearance |
| 1984 | Arkansas | 40-16 | 12-9 | |
| 1985 | Arkansas | 51-15 | 13-7 | SWC Conference Tournament Champions; NCAA Tournament Appearance; CWS Appearance |
| 1986 | Arkansas | 51-14 | 16-5 | NCAA Tournament Appearance |
| 1987 | Arkansas | 51-16-1 | 17-4 | SWC Champions; NCAA Tournament Appearance; CWS Appearance |
| 1988 | Arkansas | 39-23 | 12-9 | NCAA Tournament Appearance |
| 1989 | Arkansas | 51-16 | 17-4 | SWC Champions; NCAA Tournament Appearance; CWS Appearance |
| 1990 | Arkansas | 39-23 | 12-9 | NCAA Tournament Appearance |
| 1991 | Arkansas | 40-22 | 10-11 | |
| 1992 | Arkansas | 31-26 | 10-13 | |
| 1993 | Arkansas | 33-26 | 11-16 | |
| 1994 | Arkansas | 33-26 | 13-13 | |
| 1995 | Arkansas | 38-23 | 13-15 | NCAA Tournament Appearance |
| 1996 | Arkansas | 39-20 | 15-15 | NCAA Tournament Appearance |
| 1997 | Arkansas | 36-20 | 15-14 | |
| 1998 | Arkansas | 38-21 | 13-14 | NCAA Tournament Appearance |
| 1999 | Arkansas | 42-23 | 22-8 | SEC West Division Champions; SEC Champions; NCAA Tournament Appearance |
| 2000 | Arkansas | 24-30 | 8-20 | |
| 2001 | Arkansas | 27-29 | 11-19 | |
| 2002 | Arkansas | 35-28 | 13-14 | NCAA Tournament Appearance; Wichita Regional champions Super Regional Appearance |
| TOTALS | | 1,161–650–6 | | 2 SWC Championships; 1 SEC Championship; 15 NCAA Tournament Appearances; 4 CWS Appearances |

Source: Hog Haven Baseball Year-by-Year Record

== See also ==
- List of college baseball career coaching wins leaders
- Dave van Horn, player and later graduate assistant under DeBriyn, succeeded him as Razorbacks head coach
- Ron Polk, Mississippi State baseball legend, and friend of DeBriyn
- Cliff Gustafson, longtime rival of DeBriyn at Texas
