= Woodrow Landfair =

Author and American storyteller

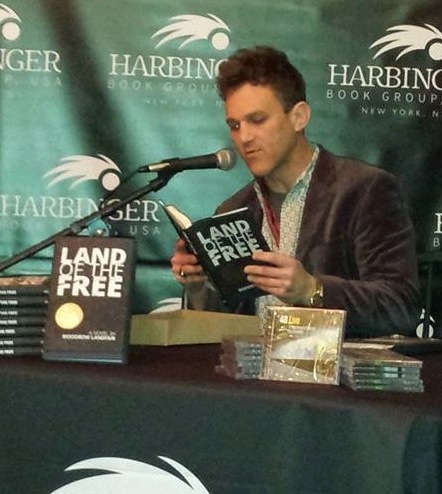
- Landfair at a reading of Land of the Free
- Born: Stanley Wood Landfair, II; November 9, 1982 (age 43); Richmond, Virginia, U.S.
- Education: University of Texas, Austin
- Occupations: Author; storyteller; laborer; entrepreneur; actor
- Writing career
- Pen name: Woodrow Landfair, Pack Landfair, Packman Surfs the World
- Genres: Fiction, nonfiction
- Notable work: Land of the Free
- Website: packmansurfstheworld.com

Woodrow Landfair (born Stanley Wood Landfair II on November 9, 1982, also called "Pack" and "Packman Surfs the World") is an American novelist, entrepreneur, motorcycle adventurer, surfer, actor, and NCAA Champion athlete. He is the owner of El Porto Surf Shop in El Porto, California and the Adventure Correspondent for HighTides Journal.

== Background ==
Landfair grew up with his mother and two sisters in Springfield, Virginia, and with his father in California - at first near Los Angeles, then in San Francisco. He enrolled at the University of Texas in 2001, on full academic scholarship from the United States Navy with the ambition to become a SEAL. Dared by fellow Midshipmen to show up at the baseball team's October 2002 walk-on tryout, Landfair earned a spot on the roster. A member of the 2005 NCAA Division I Baseball Championship team, he won varsity letters in each of his three seasons, and was voted Teammate of the Year by his fellow players for both the 2004 and 2005 campaigns.

Between 2003 and 2005, he trained with future Major League Baseball players Huston Street, JP Howell, Drew Stubbs, Omar Quintanilla, Brad Halsey, Curtis Thigpen, Michael Hollimon, Matt Holliday, Alex Hinshaw, Chris Davis, Taylor Teagarden and Sam LeCure at the University of Texas.

After injuring his lower back running marathons, he tore two discs in his spine over the course of the 2005 season. No longer a student-athlete nor on scholarship from the Navy, he studied creative writing under Zulfikar Ghose. Setting out to research and write a novel, he sold everything he had—including his National Championship ring—and, with no previous riding experience, left on a recently purchased used motorcycle.

== 48 state motorcycle journey ==
Landfair first gained notoriety in 2006, amidst an indefinite nationwide odyssey. Pawning all he owned, including his 2005 College World Series ring, he purchased a 1995 Suzuki Intruder 800 motorcycle he did not know how to ride, and left with "no route, no budget, no clue."

At first sleeping outside, he worked as a manual laborer, eventually crossing all forty-eight contiguous states. During his time on the road, he legally changed his name to Woodrow, stayed in two New York City homeless shelters, worked for cash with illegal immigrants, and spent over a month living within the Anarchist group Common Ground Collective in New Orleans's Lower Ninth Ward after Hurricane Katrina. Among other odd jobs, he worked as a day laborer, a swimming pool lifeguard, a bouncer, a truck driver, a door-to-door salesman, a beverage delivery man, a stagehand, and a waiter for an Italian restaurant with ownership ties to the Gambino crime family. Landfair used the jobs as material for oral stories. Between traveling and working, he began self-promoting in roadside bars and coffee shops where he talked about his hoboing experiences. He developed a storytelling act, eventually appearing in theaters and on regional and nationwide television.

As of May 2007, he had reached thirty-two states, performing oral stories in forty-one cities. He was featured in several newspapers nationwide and on May 8, 2007 appeared on the front page of the Austin American Statesman as part of a two-page spread. On September 23, 2007, Landfair authored and performed a one man show 48 States of Adventure at Washington D.C.'s Wolf Trap National Park for the Performing Arts in front of a capacity crowd. The show was recorded as an album, 48 LIVE, which sells on iTunes. On September 24, 2007, the Fox News Channel ran a feature on Landfair, his stories and his travels. Anchor Shepard Smith referred to Landfair as aspiring to become "the next John Steinbeck or Louis L'Amour."

From 2007-2008, he published articles as associate editor of Prop. 65 Clearinghouse in San Francisco, then joined the production staff at New York City's The Public Theater in 2009. With approval from the US State Department, Landfair left New York in 2010 to join an American delegation in Havana, Cuba.

== Land of the Free ==
In June 2014, Landfair's semi-autobiographical novel Land of the Free was published by Harbinger Book Group with the support of a twenty-eight city book tour, which retraced parts of Landfair's motorcycle travels.

The novel met mixed reviews, with Kirkus Reviews writing, “Throughout, Landfair’s evocative prose places the reader on the seemingly endless highways and byways of our expansive country. However, for all of its focus on trying to understand the American spirit, the novel fails to divulge very much information about its main character.”

== Television, film and theater ==
According to IMDb, Pack plays himself as the owner of El Porto Surf Shop in Season 1 Episode 3 of the Netflix original series Chad & JT Go Deep in 2022. Landfair appears in the Richard Linklater documentary Inning by Inning: A Portrait of a Coach, which aired on ESPN in 2008 and was filmed during the 2006 college baseball season in which coach Augie Garrido attempted to capture consecutive national titles. Landfair is also listed on the credits of Benjamin Moses Smith's short film David and the Fish.

On September 23, 2007, Landfair authored and performed a one man show 48 States of Adventure at Washington D.C.'s Wolf Trap National Park for the Performing Arts in front of a capacity crowd. The show was recorded as an album, 48 LIVE, which sells on iTunes. From 2010-2011 Landfair worked as a member of the production staff at the Public Theater led by artistic director Oskar Eustis. From 2011-2017 he performed as a salaried actor for McDonald's, appearing in the role of the company spokesperson and Chief Happiness Officer at corporate and franchisee events, as well as schools, hospitals, sporting events, and local television and radio stations.
