= 1979 Texas Longhorns baseball team =

American college baseball season

1979 Texas Longhorns baseball

NCAA Central Regional champions SWC tournament champions SWC champions

College World Series, 2–2
- Conference: Southwest Conference
- Record: 61–8 (22–2 SWC)
- Head coach: Cliff Gustafson (12th year)
- Home stadium: Disch–Falk Field

1979 Southwest Conference baseball standings
	Conf.				Overall
Team	W		L	PCT	W		L	PCT
No. 4 Texas ‍†‍‡‍^{y}	22	–	2	.917	61	–	8	.884
No. 2 Arkansas ‍‍‍^{y}	19	–	5	.792	49	–	15	.766
Baylor ‍‍‍	13	–	9	.591	34	–	15	.694
Texas A&M ‍‍‍	13	–	10	.565	30	–	20	.600
Houston ‍‍‍	11	–	13	.458	27	–	17	.614
Texas Tech ‍‍‍	9	–	15	.375	16	–	23	.410
Southern Methodist ‍‍‍	7	–	16	.304	21	–	26	.447
Texas Christian ‍‍‍	7	–	17	.292	21	–	24	.467
Rice ‍‍‍	5	–	19	.208	20	–	29	.408
† – Conference champion ‡ – Tournament champion y – Invited to the NCAA tournament As of June 30, 1979; Rankings from Collegiate Baseball

The 1979 Texas Longhorns baseball team represented the University of Texas at Austin in the 1979 NCAA Division I baseball season. The Longhorns played their home games at Disch–Falk Field. The team was coached by Cliff Gustafson in his 12th season at Texas.

The Longhorns reached the College World Series, finishing fourth with wins over Connecticut and Mississippi State and losses to eventual runner-up Arkansas and third place Pepperdine.

== Personnel ==
=== Roster ===
1979 Texas Longhorns roster
Pitchers: 17 - Tony Arnold; 19 - Keith Creel; 20 - Jim Acker; 22 - Ricky Wright; 24 - Jerry Don Gleaton; Catchers	Infielders: 3 - Andre Robertson; 7 - Ron Gardenhire; 9 - Terry Salazar; Outfielders: 1 - Joe Bruno; 12 - Paul Martin	Unknown: 2 - Doyle Scott Soden; 4 - Jim Tjader; 5 - Steven Mueller; 6 - Jerry Schmid; 8 - Mark Chelette; 10 - Kevin Shannon; 11 - Keith Owen Ferguson; 13 - Quin Lloyd; 14 - Gary Veneer; 15 - Burton Kelly Burrows; 21 - Terry Kem Wright; 27 - Keith Walker

== Schedule and results ==
Legend
Texas win
Texas loss
Tie

1979 Texas Longhorns baseball game log
Regular season

February
Date	Opponent	Site/stadium	Score	Overall record	SWC record
Feb 15	St. Mary's*	Disch–Falk Field • Austin, TX	W 8–1	1–0	
Feb 15	St. Mary's*	Disch–Falk Field • Austin, TX	W 9–3	2–0	
Feb 22	Texas Wesleyan*	Disch–Falk Field • Austin, TX	W 2–0	3–0	
Feb 22	Texas Wesleyan*	Disch–Falk Field • Austin, TX	W 10–9	4–0	
Feb 23	Hosei*	Disch–Falk Field • Austin, TX	W 3–0	5–0	
Feb 23	Hosei*	Disch–Falk Field • Austin, TX	W 2–0	6–0	
Feb 24	Louisiana Tech*	Disch–Falk Field • Austin, TX	W 6–1	7–0	
Feb 24	Louisiana Tech*	Disch–Falk Field • Austin, TX	W 11–3	8–0	
Feb 26	Louisiana Tech*	Disch–Falk Field • Austin, TX	W 5–0	9–0	
Feb 26	Louisiana Tech*	Disch–Falk Field • Austin, TX	W 11–3	10–0	
Feb 27	Texas Lutheran*	Disch–Falk Field • Austin, TX	W 13–4	11–0	
Feb 27	Texas Lutheran*	Disch–Falk Field • Austin, TX	W 13–1	12–0	

March
Date	Opponent	Site/stadium	Score	Overall record	SWC record
Mar 2	at Arkansas	George Cole Field • Fayetteville, AR	L 0–2	12–1	0–1
Mar 3	at Arkansas	George Cole Field • Fayetteville, AR	W 3–2^{8}	13–1	1–1
Mar 3	at Arkansas	George Cole Field • Fayetteville, AR	W 1–0	14–1	2–1
Mar 6	Hardin–Simmons*	Disch–Falk Field • Austin, TX	W 3–2^{8}	15–1	
Mar 6	Hardin–Simmons*	Disch–Falk Field • Austin, TX	W 2–1^{8}	16–1	
Mar 9	Houston	Disch–Falk Field • Austin, TX	W 6–3	17–1	3–1
Mar 10	Houston	Disch–Falk Field • Austin, TX	W 3–1	18–1	4–1
Mar 10	Houston	Disch–Falk Field • Austin, TX	W 2–0	19–1	5–1
Mar 12	Lubbock Christian*	Disch–Falk Field • Austin, TX	W 14–5	20–1	
Mar 12	Lubbock Christian*	Disch–Falk Field • Austin, TX	W 14–10	21–1	
Mar 13	Lubbock Christian*	Disch–Falk Field • Austin, TX	W 4–3^{8}	22–1	
Mar 13	Lubbock Christian*	Disch–Falk Field • Austin, TX	W 11–1	23–1	
Mar 14	Southwestern*	Disch–Falk Field • Austin, TX	W 6–2	24–1	
Mar 14	Southwestern*	Disch–Falk Field • Austin, TX	W 12–3	25–1	
Mar 17	Eastern Michigan*	Disch–Falk Field • Austin, TX	W 8–2	26–1	
Mar 17	Eastern Michigan*	Disch–Falk Field • Austin, TX	W 8–1	27–1	
Mar 18	Eastern Michigan*	Disch–Falk Field • Austin, TX	W 13–10	28–1	
Mar 19	Eastern Michigan*	Disch–Falk Field • Austin, TX	W 8–3	29–1	
Mar 19	Minnesota*	Disch–Falk Field • Austin, TX	W 6–5^{12}	30–1	
Mar 20	Minnesota*	Disch–Falk Field • Austin, TX	L 4–11	30–2	
Mar 20	Minnesota*	Disch–Falk Field • Austin, TX	W 9–2	31–2	
Mar 23	Arizona*	Disch–Falk Field • Austin, TX	L 2–8	31–3	
Mar 23	Arizona*	Disch–Falk Field • Austin, TX	L 4–7	31–4	
Mar 24	Arizona*	Disch–Falk Field • Austin, TX	L 3–7	31–5	
Mar 24	Arizona*	Disch–Falk Field • Austin, TX	W 4–0	32–5	
Mar 30	Rice	Disch–Falk Field • Austin, TX	W 12–3	33–5	6–1
Mar 31	Rice	Disch–Falk Field • Austin, TX	W 7–0 (Note: Terry Wright threw a no-hitter.)	34–5	7–1
Mar 31	Rice	Disch–Falk Field • Austin, TX	W 16–0	35–5	8–1

April
Date	Opponent	Site/stadium	Score	Overall record	SWC record
Apr 6	at Baylor	Ferrell Field • Waco, TX	W 6–3	36–5	9–1
Apr 7	at Baylor	Ferrell Field • Waco, TX	W 5–0	37–5	10–1
Apr 7	at Baylor	Ferrell Field • Waco, TX	W 9–6	38–5	11–1
Apr 13	TCU	Disch–Falk Field • Austin, TX	W 3–1	39–5	12–1
Apr 14	TCU	Disch–Falk Field • Austin, TX	W 5–1	40–5	13–1
Apr 14	TCU	Disch–Falk Field • Austin, TX	W 15–5	41–5	14–1
Apr 20	at SMU	Dallas, TX	W 10–2	42–5	15–1
Apr 21	at SMU	Dallas, TX	W 5–3	43–5	16–1
Apr 21	at SMU	Dallas, TX	W 13–7	44–5	17–1
Apr 27	Texas Tech	Disch–Falk Field • Austin, TX	W 4–1	45–5	18–1
Apr 28	Texas Tech	Disch–Falk Field • Austin, TX	W 3–1	46–5	19–1
Apr 28	Texas Tech	Disch–Falk Field • Austin, TX	W 5–1	47–5	20–1

May
Date	Opponent	Site/stadium	Score	Overall record	SWC record
May 5	at Texas A&M	Olsen Field • College Station, TX	L 0–1	47–6	20–2
May 6	at Texas A&M	Olsen Field • College Station, TX	W 3–2^{10}	48–6	21–2
May 6	at Texas A&M	Olsen Field • College Station, TX	W 3–0	49–6	22–2

Postseason

SWC Tournament
Date	Opponent	Site/stadium	Score	Overall record	SWCT Record
May 12	Texas A&M	Disch–Falk Field • Austin, TX	W 6–4	50–6	1–0
May 13	Arkansas	Disch–Falk Field • Austin, TX	W 6–2	51–6	2–0
May 14	Arkansas	Disch–Falk Field • Austin, TX	W 12–6	52–6	3–0

Exhibitions
Date	Opponent	Site/stadium	Score	Overall record
May 18	Southwest Bank	Disch–Falk Field • Austin, TX	W 9–0	53–6
May 18	Southwest Bank	Disch–Falk Field • Austin, TX	W 13–2	54–6
May 22	Southwest Bank	Disch–Falk Field • Austin, TX	W 10–2	55–6
May 22	Southwest Bank	Disch–Falk Field • Austin, TX	W 7–6	56–6

NCAA Central Regional
Date	Opponent	Site/stadium	Score	Overall record	NCAAT record
May 25	Texas–Pan American	Disch–Falk Field • Austin, TX	W 4–2	57–6	1–0
May 26	Lamar	Disch–Falk Field • Austin, TX	W 6–4	58–6	2–0
May 28	BYU	Disch–Falk Field • Austin, TX	W 6–2	59–6	3–0

College World Series
Date	Opponent	Site/stadium	Score	Overall record	CWS record
June 2	Connecticut	Johnny Rosenblatt Stadium • Omaha, NE	W 11–5	60–6	1–0
June 3	Mississippi State	Johnny Rosenblatt Stadium • Omaha, NE	W 8–2	61–6	2–0
June 5	Arkansas	Johnny Rosenblatt Stadium • Omaha, NE	L 4–9	61–7	2–1
June 6	Pepperdine	Johnny Rosenblatt Stadium • Omaha, NE	L 4–6	61–8	2–2
