= 1979 Miami Hurricanes baseball team =

American college baseball season

1979 Miami Hurricanes baseball

NCAA Atlantic Regional champions

College World Series, 0–2
- Conference: Independent
- Record: 55–11
- Head coach: Ron Fraser (17th year)
- Home stadium: Mark Light Field

1979 NCAA Division I baseball independents standings
	Conf.				Overall
Team	W		L	PCT	W		L	PCT
No. 7 Miami (FL) ‍‍‍^{y}		–		–	55	–	11	.833
No. 11 Hawaii ‍‍‍^{y}		–		–	69	–	15	.821
No. 23 Texas–Pan American ‍‍‍^{y}		–		–	52	–	12	.813
Air Force ‍‍‍		–		–	33	–	13	.717
No. 27 Florida State ‍‍‍^{y}		–		–	43	–	17	.717
Mercer ‍‍‍		–		–	38	–	16	.704
Villanova ‍‍‍		–		–	16	–	9	.640
Detroit ‍‍‍		–		–	34	–	22	.607
No. 11 Gonzaga ‍‍‍		–		–	25	–	17	.595
Stetson ‍‍‍		–		–	26	–	24	.520
Georgia Tech ‍‍‍		–		–	15	–	16	.484
Campbell ‍‍‍		–		–	17	–	20	.459
Notre Dame ‍‍‍		–		–	14	–	19	.424
Louisville ‍‍‍		–		–	18	–	27	.400
Northern Iowa ‍‍‍		–		–	11	–	17	.393
Lafayette ‍‍‍		–		–	9	–	15	.375
Hofstra ‍‍‍		–		–	6	–	18	.250
y – Invited to the NCAA tournament As of June 30, 1979; Rankings from Collegiate Baseball

The 1979 Miami Hurricanes baseball team represented the University of Miami in the 1979 NCAA Division I baseball season. The Hurricanes played their home games at Mark Light Field. The team was coached by Ron Fraser in his 17th season at Miami.

The Hurricanes reached the College World Series, where they were eliminated after a pair of losses to Arizona and Pepperdine.

== Personnel ==
=== Roster ===
1979 Miami Hurricanes roster
Pitchers: Mark Batten; Eddie Escribano; Randy Guerra; Neal Heaton; Jeff Morrison; Catchers: Frank Castro	Infielders: Ross Jones; Mike Pagliarulo; Outfielders: Tony Brewer; Matt Tyner	Unknown: Ron Batter; Walt Brooks; Dan Canevari; Alex DeJesus; Rick Del Giudice; Rick Diaz; Lou Duarte; Bobby Estrada; Dino Gale; Terry Gallagher; Leigh Gullette; Paul Hundhammer; Chuck Keller; Mike Kutner; Pat Patterson; Rich Pazo; Rob Rajisch; Steve Riese; Alfredo Rodriguez; Gary Ross; Howie Shapiro

=== Coaches ===
1979 Miami Hurricanes baseball coaching staff
- Ron Fraser – Head coach – 17th year

== Schedule and results ==
Legend
Miami win
Miami loss

1979 Miami Hurricanes baseball game log
Regular season

February
Date	Opponent	Site/stadium	Score	Overall record
Feb 16	Marshall	Mark Light Field • Coral Gables, FL	W 7–5	1–0
Feb 17	Marshall	Mark Light Field • Coral Gables, FL	W 8–3	2–0
Feb 23	FIU	Mark Light Field • Coral Gables, FL	W 11–3	3–0
Feb 24	FIU	Mark Light Field • Coral Gables, FL	W 12–4	4–0

March
Date	Opponent	Site/stadium	Score	Overall record
Mar 1	Florida A&M	Mark Light Field • Coral Gables, FL	W 17–0	5–0
Mar 2	Florida A&M	Mark Light Field • Coral Gables, FL	W 14–0	6–0
Mar 3	Florida	Mark Light Field • Coral Gables, FL	W 8–2	7–0
Mar 4	Florida	Mark Light Field • Coral Gables, FL	W 5–2	8–0
Mar 5	James Madison	Mark Light Field • Coral Gables, FL	W 20–8	9–0
Mar 6	St. Joseph's	Mark Light Field • Coral Gables, FL	W 6–2	10–0
Mar 7	at Jacksonville	Jacksonville, FL	L 0–6	10–1
Mar 9	St. Joseph's	Mark Light Field • Coral Gables, FL	W 8–5	11–1
Mar 10	Ithaca	Mark Light Field • Coral Gables, FL	W 11–6	12–1
Mar 10	Southern Illinois	Mark Light Field • Coral Gables, FL	W 11–2	13–1
Mar 11	Ithaca	Mark Light Field • Coral Gables, FL	W 21–0	14–1
Mar 12	Oklahoma State	Mark Light Field • Coral Gables, FL	L 1–2	14–2
Mar 13	Southern Illinois	Mark Light Field • Coral Gables, FL	L 0–7	14–3
Mar 14	Texas A&M	Mark Light Field • Coral Gables, FL	W 3–1	15–3
Mar 15	Oklahoma State	Mark Light Field • Coral Gables, FL	W 6–0	16–3
Mar 16	Southern Illinois	Mark Light Field • Coral Gables, FL	W 5–3	17–3
Mar 17	Texas A&M	Mark Light Field • Coral Gables, FL	L 3–4	17–4
Mar 19	Arizona State	Mark Light Field • Coral Gables, FL	W 9–0	18–4
Mar 20	Arizona State	Mark Light Field • Coral Gables, FL	W 10–1	19–4
Mar 21	Arizona State	Mark Light Field • Coral Gables, FL	W 11–9	20–4
Mar 22	Georgia Southern	Mark Light Field • Coral Gables, FL	W 7–4	21–4
Mar 23	Georgia Southern	Mark Light Field • Coral Gables, FL	W 10–6	22–4
Mar 24	Bowling Green	Mark Light Field • Coral Gables, FL	W 10–1	23–4
Mar 26	Long Island	Mark Light Field • Coral Gables, FL	W 12–5	24–4
Mar 27	St. Francis (NY)	Mark Light Field • Coral Gables, FL	W 10–3	25–4
Mar 28	Glassboro State	Mark Light Field • Coral Gables, FL	L 1–3	25–5
Mar 28	St. Francis (NY)	Mark Light Field • Coral Gables, FL	W 15–5	26–5
Mar 29	Glassboro State	Mark Light Field • Coral Gables, FL	W 9–4	27–5
Mar 30	Florida State	Mark Light Field • Coral Gables, FL	W 4–3	28–5
Mar 31	Florida State	Mark Light Field • Coral Gables, FL	W 5–3	29–5

April
Date	Opponent	Site/stadium	Score	Overall record
Apr 1	Baltimore Orioles	Mark Light Field • Coral Gables, FL	L 3–5	
Apr 2	Jacksonville	Mark Light Field • Coral Gables, FL	W 22–14	30–5
Apr 3	Jacksonville	Mark Light Field • Coral Gables, FL	W 5–0	31–5
Apr 3	Jacksonville	Mark Light Field • Coral Gables, FL	W 14–5	32–5
Apr 5	Buffalo	Mark Light Field • Coral Gables, FL	W 5–3	33–5
Apr 6	at South Florida	Red McEwen Field • Tampa, FL	L 3–9	33–6
Apr 7	at South Florida	Red McEwen Field • Tampa, FL	W 3–2	34–6
Apr 8	Buffalo	Mark Light Field • Coral Gables, FL	W 8–3	35–6
Apr 8	Howard	Mark Light Field • Coral Gables, FL	W 10–4	36–6
Apr 9	Buffalo	Mark Light Field • Coral Gables, FL	W 10–7	37–6
Apr 10	Buffalo	Mark Light Field • Coral Gables, FL	W 3–0	38–6
Apr 11	at Florida State	Seminole Field • Tallahassee, FL	L 2–9	38–7
Apr 12	at Florida State	Seminole Field • Tallahassee, FL	L 2–3	38–8
Apr 13	at Florida A&M	Tallahassee, FL	W 1–0	39–8
Apr 13	at Florida A&M	Tallahassee, FL	L 0–5	39–9
Apr 14	Buffalo	Mark Light Field • Coral Gables, FL	W 5–3	40–9
Apr 15	Buffalo	Mark Light Field • Coral Gables, FL	W 10–0	41–9
Apr 18	Biscayne	Mark Light Field • Coral Gables, FL	W 10–1	42–9
Apr 20	at Stetson	Conrad Park • DeLand, FL	W 12–3	43–9
Apr 20	at Stetson	Conrad Park • DeLand, FL	W 4–0	44–9
Apr 21	at Stetson	Conrad Park • DeLand, FL	W 14–10	45–9
Apr 24	Biscayne	Mark Light Field • Coral Gables, FL	W 5–1	46–9
Apr 27	South Florida	Mark Light Field • Coral Gables, FL	W 10–3	47–9
Apr 28	South Florida	Mark Light Field • Coral Gables, FL	W 14–7	48–9

May
Date	Opponent	Site/stadium	Score	Overall record
May 10	at South Carolina	Sarge Frye Field • Columbia, SC	W 9–0	49–9
May 11	at South Carolina	Sarge Frye Field • Columbia, SC	W 9–0	50–9
May 13	at South Carolina	Sarge Frye Field • Columbia, SC	W 3–1	51–9
May 14	at South Carolina	Sarge Frye Field • Columbia, SC	W 6–1	52–9

Postseason

NCAA Atlantic Regional
Date	Opponent	Site/stadium	Score	Overall record	NCAAT record
May 18	The Citadel	Mark Light Field • Coral Gables, FL	W 3–1^{16}	53–9	1–0
May 19	Clemson	Mark Light Field • Coral Gables, FL	W 2–1	54–9	2–0
May 20	Clemson	Mark Light Field • Coral Gables, FL	W 4–1	55–9	3–0

College World Series
Date	Opponent	Site/stadium	Score	Overall record	CWS record
June 1	Arizona	Johnny Rosenblatt Stadium • Omaha, NE	L 1–5	55–10	0–1
June 3	Pepperdine	Johnny Rosenblatt Stadium • Omaha, NE	L 3–9	55–11	0–2
