= 1979 Mississippi State Bulldogs baseball team =

American college baseball season

1979 Mississippi State Bulldogs baseball

SEC West champions SEC Tournament champions NCAA South Regional champions

College World Series, 1–2
- Conference: Southeastern Conference
- CB: No. 6
- Record: 48–12 (17–2 SEC)
- Head coach: Ron Polk (4th season)
- Home stadium: Dudy Noble Field

1979 Southeastern Conference baseball standings
	Conf.				Overall
Team	W		L	PCT	W		L	PCT
Eastern Division
No. 19 Florida ^{x}‍‍‍^{y}	16	–	8	.667	40	–	20	.667
Kentucky ‍‍‍	13	–	11	.542	29	–	18	.617
Georgia ‍‍‍	11	–	11	.500	24	–	18	.571
Tennessee ‍‍‍	10	–	14	.417	25	–	22	.532
Vanderbilt ‍‍‍	8	–	14	.364	21	–	25	.457
Western Division
No. 6 Mississippi State ^{x}‍‍‡‍^{y}	17	–	2	.895	48	–	12	.800
LSU ‍‍‍	13	–	7	.650	34	–	20	.630
Ole Miss ‍‍‍	9	–	10	.474	24	–	13	.649
Auburn ‍‍‍	7	–	14	.333	21	–	21	.500
Alabama ‍‍‍	4	–	17	.190	18	–	27	.400
x – Division champion ‡ – Tournament champion y – Invited to the NCAA tournament As of June 30, 1979; Rankings from Collegiate Baseball

The 1979 Mississippi State Bulldogs baseball team represented the Mississippi State University in the 1979 NCAA Division I baseball season. They were led by head coach Ron Polk in his fourth season and played their home games at Dudy Noble Field. The Bulldogs were members of the Southeastern Conference, and finished with a record of 48–12, champions of the SEC West with a record of 17–2 and winners of the SEC Tournament.

Mississippi State was invited to the NCAA Tournament, where they won the South Regional to advance to their second College World Series. The Bulldogs tied for fifth, recording an opening round win against eventual champion Cal State Fullerton and losses to semifinalist Texas and third place Pepperdine.

== Personnel ==
=== Roster ===
1979 Mississippi State Bulldogs roster
Pitchers: 9 - Bryan Hardwick - Freshman; 12 - Josh Reagan - Senior; 13 - Don Mundie - Sophomore; 17 - John Shrewsberry - Sophomore; 18 - Ken Kurtz - Junior; 22 - Steve Susce - Freshman; 23 - Robert Taylor - Junior; 32 - Terry Bartley - Junior; 33 - Perry Cilburn - Junior	Catchers: 8 - Mike Sterling - Senior; 16 - Scott Galloway - Senior; 28 - Terry Loe - Junior; 31 - Robert Smith - Junior; Outfielders: 2 - Mike Kelley - Senior; 5 - Larry Pavlou - Senior; 10 - Lea Paslay - Sophomore; 19 - Bob Kocol - Senior; 25 - Brad Winkler - Freshman; 30 - David Lowther - Freshman; 37 - James Otis Doss - Sophomore	Infielders: 3 - Pete Torres - Senior; 6 - Boyd Conner - Senior; 11 - Tim Weisheim - Senior; 15 - Dave Klipstein - Freshman; 20 - Dale Hannah - Senior; 29 - Pete White - Freshman; 35 - Bruce Castoria - Freshman; 36 - Rick Dixon - Junior; Utility: 4 - Randy Schlosser - Junior; 26 - John McDonald - Junior; 38 - Mike Pruser - Sophomore

=== Coaching staff ===
1979 Mississippi State Bulldogs coaching staff
- - Ron Polk - Head coach – 4th season
- - Mark Johnson - 4th season

== Schedule ==
1979 Mississippi State Bulldogs baseball game log
Regular season

February/March
Date	Opponent	Site/stadium	Score	Overall record	SEC record
Feb 27	Mississippi College*	Dudy Noble Field • Starkville, MS	W 5–0	1–0	
Feb 28	Livingston*	Dudy Noble Field • Starkville, MS	W 7–1	2–0	
Mar 1	Livingston*	Dudy Noble Field • Starkville, MS	W 15–8	3–0	
Mar 4	at LSU	Alex Box Stadium • Baton Rouge, LA	W 3–1 ^{(7)}	4–0	1–0
Mar 4	at LSU	Alex Box Stadium • Baton Rouge, LA	L 1–2	4–1	1–1
Mar 6	Arkansas State*	Dudy Noble Field • Starkville, MS	W 11–3	5–1	
Mar 7	Arkansas State*	Dudy Noble Field • Starkville, MS	W 5–4	6–1	
Mar 8	at Jackson State*	Jackson, MS	L 3–4	6–2	
Mar 9	at Jackson State*	Jackson, MS	W 3–0	7–2	
Mar 11	Alabama	Dudy Noble Field • Starkville, MS	W 5–1 ^{(7)}	8–2	2–1
Mar 11	Alabama	Dudy Noble Field • Starkville, MS	W 6–1 ^{(7)}	9–2	3–1
Mar 13	Delta State*	Dudy Noble Field • Starkville, MS	W 4–2	10–2	
Mar 14	Delta State*	Dudy Noble Field • Starkville, MS	W 9–8 ^{(10)}	11–2	
Mar 17	Auburn	Dudy Noble Field • Starkville, MS	W 13–5 ^{(7)}	12–2	4–1
Mar 17	Auburn	Dudy Noble Field • Starkville, MS	W 11–2 ^{(7)}	13–2	5–1
Mar 18	Auburn	Dudy Noble Field • Starkville, MS	W 15–8	14–2	6–1
Mar 21	Missouri Baptist*	Dudy Noble Field • Starkville, MS	W 10–6	15–2	
Mar 22	Missouri Baptist*	Dudy Noble Field • Starkville, MS	W 5–3	16–2	
Mar 23	at South Alabama*	Mobile, AL	L 7–8	16–3	
Mar 24	at South Alabama*	Mobile, AL	W 12–1	17–3	
Mar 25	at Southern Miss*	Hattiesburg, MS	W 17–2	18–3	
Mar 26	at Southern Miss*	Hattiesburg, MS	W 9–8	19–3	
Mar 27	St. Olaf*	Dudy Noble Field • Starkville, MS	W 23–4	20–3	
Mar 28	St. Olaf*	Dudy Noble Field • Starkville, MS	W 4–1 ^{(7)}	21–3	
Mar 31	Ole Miss	Dudy Noble Field • Starkville, MS	W 4–1 ^{(7)}	22–3	7–1
Mar 31	Ole Miss	Dudy Noble Field • Starkville, MS	W 10–0 ^{(7)}	23–3	8–1

April/May
Date	Opponent	Site/stadium	Score	Overall record	SEC record
Apr 1	Ole Miss	Dudy Noble Field • Starkville, MS	W 12–4	24–3	9–1
Apr 4	Birmingham–Southern*	Dudy Noble Field • Starkville, MS	W 12–3	25–3	
Apr 5	Birmingham–Southern*	Dudy Noble Field • Starkville, MS	W 11–1	26–3	
Apr 7	LSU	Dudy Noble Field • Starkville, MS	W 5–0 ^{(7)}	27–3	10–1
Apr 7	LSU	Dudy Noble Field • Starkville, MS	W 5–2 ^{(7)}	28–3	11–1
Apr 13	at Hawaii*	UH Stadium • Honolulu, HI	L 5–6	28–4	
Apr 14	at Hawaii*	UH Stadium • Honolulu, HI	L 8–9 ^{(8)}	28–5	
Apr 14	at Hawaii*	UH Stadium • Honolulu, HI	L 12–19	28–6	
Apr 15	at Hawaii*	UH Stadium • Honolulu, HI	W 6–4	29–6	
Apr 15	at Hawaii*	UH Stadium • Honolulu, HI	W 7–6	30–6	
Apr 17	at Hawaii*	UH Stadium • Honolulu, HI	L 0–10	30–7	
Apr 21	at Auburn	Plainsman Park • Auburn, AL	W 4–1 ^{(7)}	31–7	12–1
Apr 21	at Auburn	Plainsman Park • Auburn, AL	L 0–3 ^{(7)}	31–8	12–2
Apr 22	at Auburn	Plainsman Park • Auburn, AL	W 7–1	32–8	13–2
Apr 25	at Alabama	Sewell–Thomas Stadium • Tuscaloosa, AL	W 6–4 ^{(10)}	33–8	14–2
Apr 25	at Alabama	Sewell–Thomas Stadium • Tuscaloosa, AL	W 2–0 ^{(7)}	34–8	15–2
Apr 26	Mississippi College*	Dudy Noble Field • Starkville, MS	W 6–1	35–8	
Apr 27	William Carey*	Dudy Noble Field • Starkville, MS	L 6–10	35–9	
Apr 28	William Carey*	Dudy Noble Field • Starkville, MS	W 3–2	36–9	
Apr 30	Louisiana Tech*	Dudy Noble Field • Starkville, MS	W 2–0	37–9	
Apr 30	Louisiana Tech*	Dudy Noble Field • Starkville, MS	W 14–8	38–9	
May 6	at Ole Miss	Swayze Field • Oxford, MS (Rivalry)	W 5–3 ^{(7)}	39–9	16–2
May 6	at Ole Miss	Swayze Field • Oxford, MS	W 5–1 ^{(7)}	40–9	17–2

Postseason

SEC Tournament
Date	Opponent	Site/stadium	Score	Overall record	SECT record
May 11	Kentucky	Dudy Noble Field • Starkville, MS	W 6–5	41–9	1–0
May 13	LSU	Dudy Noble Field • Starkville, MS	W 12–5	42–9	2–0
May 14	Florida	Dudy Noble Field • Starkville, MS	W 12–11	43–9	3–0

NCAA South Regional
Date	Opponent	Site/stadium	Score	Overall record	Regional record
May 18	New Orleans	Dudy Noble Field • Starkville, MS	L 11–13	43–10	0–1
May 19	Tulane	Dudy Noble Field • Starkville, MS	W 12–4	44–10	1–1
May 20	New Orleans	Dudy Noble Field • Starkville, MS	W 13–10	45–10	2–1
May 20	Murray State	Dudy Noble Field • Starkville, MS	W 8–6	46–10	3–1
May 21	Murray State	Dudy Noble Field • Starkville, MS	W 18–8	47–10	4–1

College World Series
Date	Opponent	Site/stadium	Score	Overall record	CWS record
June 2	Cal State Fullerton	Johnny Rosenblatt Stadium • Omaha, NE	W 6–1	48–10	1–0
June 3	Texas	Johnny Rosenblatt Stadium • Omaha, NE	L 2–8	48–11	1–1
June 4	Pepperdine	Johnny Rosenblatt Stadium • Omaha, NE	L 4–5 ^{(10)}	48–12	1–2
