= 1979 Southeastern Conference baseball tournament =

- Teams: 4
- Format: Four-team double elimination tournament
- Finals site: Dudy Noble Field; Starkville, Mississippi
- Champions: Mississippi State (1st title)
- Winning coach: Ron Polk (1st title)
- MVP: Mike Kelley (Mississippi State)

1979 Southeastern Conference baseball standings
	Conf.				Overall
Team	W		L	PCT	W		L	PCT
Eastern Division
No. 19 Florida ^{x}‍‍‍^{y}	16	–	8	.667	40	–	20	.667
Kentucky ‍‍‍	13	–	11	.542	29	–	18	.617
Georgia ‍‍‍	11	–	11	.500	24	–	18	.571
Tennessee ‍‍‍	10	–	14	.417	25	–	22	.532
Vanderbilt ‍‍‍	8	–	14	.364	21	–	25	.457
Western Division
No. 6 Mississippi State ^{x}‍‍‡‍^{y}	17	–	2	.895	48	–	12	.800
LSU ‍‍‍	13	–	7	.650	34	–	20	.630
Ole Miss ‍‍‍	9	–	10	.474	24	–	13	.649
Auburn ‍‍‍	7	–	14	.333	21	–	21	.500
Alabama ‍‍‍	4	–	17	.190	18	–	27	.400
x – Division champion ‡ – Tournament champion y – Invited to the NCAA tournament As of June 30, 1979; Rankings from Collegiate Baseball

The 1979 Southeastern Conference baseball tournament was held at Dudy Noble Field in Starkville, Mississippi, from May 11 through 13. Mississippi State won the tournament and earned the Southeastern Conference's automatic bid to the 1979 NCAA tournament.

== Regular season results ==
Team	W	L	Pct	GB	Seed
Eastern Division
Florida	16	8	.667	—	2
Kentucky	13	11	.542	3	4
Georgia	11	11	.500	4	—
Tennessee	10	14	.417	6	—
Vanderbilt	8	14	.364	7	—

Team	W	L	Pct	GB	Seed
Western Division
Mississippi State	17	2	.895	—	1
LSU	13	7	.650	4.5	3
Ole Miss	9	10	.474	8	—
Auburn	7	14	.333	11	—
Alabama	4	17	.190	14	—

== Tournament ==
First round
1	Mississippi State	6
4	Kentucky	4
3	LSU	5
2	Florida	2
Lower round 1
4	Kentucky	1
2	Florida	7

Semi-finals
1	Mississippi State	12
3	LSU	5
Lower final
2	Florida	5
3	LSU	1

Finals
1	Mississippi State	12	–
2	Florida	11	–

== All-Tournament Team ==
Position	Player	School
1B	Tim Weisheim	Mississippi State
2B	Chuck Long	Florida
3B	Bobby Mariano	LSU
SS	Larry Hall	Florida
C	John McDonald	Mississippi State
OF	Mike Kelley	Mississippi State
OF	Bob Kocol	Mississippi State
OF	Jim Watkins	Florida
DH	Tony Stevens	Florida
UT	Steve Bollman	LSU
P	Kerry Kellogg	Florida
P	Ken Kurtz	Mississippi State
MVP	Mike Kelley	Mississippi State

== See also ==
- College World Series
- NCAA Division I Baseball Championship
- Southeastern Conference baseball tournament
