= 1979 NCAA Division I baseball tournament =

- Season: 1979
- Teams: 34
- Finals site: Johnny Rosenblatt Stadium; Omaha, Nebraska
- Champions: Cal State Fullerton (1st title)
- Runner-up: Arkansas (1st CWS Appearance)
- Winning coach: Augie Garrido (1st title)
- MOP: Tony Hudson (Cal State Fullerton)

The 1979 NCAA Division I baseball tournament was played at the end of the 1979 NCAA Division I baseball season to determine the national champion of college baseball. The tournament concluded with eight teams competing in the College World Series, a double-elimination tournament in its thirty third year. Eight regional competitions were held to determine the participants in the final event. Seven regions held a four team, double-elimination tournament while one region included six teams, resulting in 34 teams participating in the tournament at the conclusion of their regular season, and in some cases, after a conference tournament. The thirty-third tournament's champion was Cal State Fullerton, coached by Augie Garrido. The Most Outstanding Player was Tony Hudson of Cal State Fullerton.

== Regionals ==
Seven of the eight regionals were played as 4-team double-elimination tournaments. One regional was played as a 6-team double-elimination tournament. The winner of each regional moved on to the College World Series.

=== Northeast Regional ===
Games played at Annapolis, Maryland.

First Round
Connecticut	5
Navy	4
St. John's	5
Nebraska	0
Lower round 1
Navy	4
Nebraska	13

Semi-Finals
St. John's	6
Connecticut	3
Lower final
Connecticut	15
Nebraska	0

Finals
St. John's	4	0
Connecticut	14	4

=== Atlantic Regional ===
Games played at Coral Gables, Florida.

First Round
Clemson	8
Georgia Southern	4
Miami (FL)	3^{16}
The Citadel	1
Lower round 1
Georgia Southern	5
The Citadel	3

Semi-Finals
Clemson	1
Miami (FL)	2
Lower final
Clemson	2
Georgia Southern	0

Finals
Miami (FL)	4	—
Clemson	1	—

=== Mideast Regional ===
Games played at East Lansing, Michigan.

First Round
San Diego State	11
Miami (OH)	6
Pepperdine	15
Michigan State	0
Lower round 1
Miami (OH)	4
Michigan State	6

Semi-Finals
San Diego State	9
Pepperdine	15
Lower final
San Diego State	5
Michigan State	4

Finals
Pepperdine	13	—
San Diego State	2	—

=== East Regional ===
Games played at Tallahassee, Florida

First Round
Delaware	10
Seton Hall	1
Arkansas	12
George Washington	11
Florida	9
Florida State	5

Second Round
Delaware	7
Florida State	6
Arkansas	9
Florida	1
Seton Hall	2
George Washington	5

Third Round
Delaware	6
Arkansas	8
Florida	12
George Washington	7

Semi-Finals
Delaware	7
Florida	5

Finals
Arkansas	4	—
Delaware	3	—

=== Midwest Regional ===
Games played at Tucson, Arizona.

First Round
Hawaii	4
Indiana State	3
Arizona	8
Oklahoma	1
Lower round 1
Indiana State	2
Oklahoma	9

Semi-Finals
Hawaii	2
Arizona	10
Lower final
Hawaii	12
Oklahoma	8

Finals
Arizona	5	—
Hawaii	3	—

=== Central Regional ===
Games played at Austin, Texas.

First Round
Texas	4
Texas–Pan American	2
Lamar	3
BYU	2
Lower round 1
Texas–Pan American	5
BYU	11

Semi-Finals
Texas	6
Lamar	4
Lower final
Lamar	4
BYU	7

Finals
Texas	6	—
BYU	2	—

=== South Regional ===
Games played at Starkville, Mississippi.

First Round
Murray State	5
Tulane	3
New Orleans	13
Mississippi State	11
Lower round 1
Tulane	4
Mississippi State	12

Semi-Finals
Murray State	16
New Orleans	15
Lower final
New Orleans	10
Mississippi State	13

Finals
Murray State	6	8
Mississippi State	8	18

=== West Regional ===
Games played at Fresno, California.

First Round
UCLA	5
Cal State Fullerton	4
Fresno State	10*
Portland	8*
Lower round 1
Cal State Fullerton	20
Portland	3

Semi-Finals
UCLA	5
Fresno State	4
Lower final
Fresno State	3
Cal State Fullerton	12

Finals
UCLA	2	5
Cal State Fullerton	9	9

== College World Series ==
Connecticut, Miami (FL), Pepperdine, Arkansas, Arizona, Texas, Mississippi St., and Cal St. Fullerton won their regionals and moved on to the College World Series.

=== Participants ===
School	Conference	Record (conference)	Head coach	CWS appearances	CWS best finish	CWS record
Arizona	Pac-10	42–23 (17–13)	Jerry Kindall	10 (last: 1976)	1st (1976)	21–19
Arkansas	SWC	46–13 (19–5)	Norm DeBriyn	0 (last: none)	none	0–0
Cal State Fullerton	SCBA	55–13 (23–4)	Augie Garrido	1 (last: 1975)	7th (1975)	0–2
Connecticut	Eastern Collegiate	31–11 (n/a)	Larry Panciera	4 (last: 1972)	5th (1957, 1972)	3–8
Miami (FL)	n/a	55–9 (n/a)	Ron Fraser	2 (last: 1978)	2nd (1974)	5–4
Mississippi State	SEC	47–10 (17–2)	Ron Polk	1 (last: 1971)	7th (1971)	0–2
Pepperdine	SCBA	50–16 (19–9)	Dave Gorrie	0 (last: none)	none	0–0
Texas	SWC	53–6 (22–2)	Cliff Gustafson	17 (last: 1975)	1st (1949, 1950, 1975)	36–30

=== Results ===
==== Bracket ====
Upper round 1
Arkansas	5
Pepperdine	4
Arizona	5
Miami (FL)	1
Texas	11
Connecticut	5
Mississippi State	6
Cal State Fullerton	1

Upper round 2
Arkansas	10
Arizona	3
Texas	8
Mississippi State	2
Lower round 1
Pepperdine	9
Miami (FL)	3
Connecticut	3
Cal State Fullerton	8

Upper final
Arkansas	9
Texas	4
Lower round 2
Mississippi State	4
Pepperdine	5^{10}
Arizona	3
Cal State Fullerton	16

Semifinals
Arkansas	10
Cal State Fullerton	13
Texas	4
Pepperdine	6

Preliminary final
Cal State Fullerton	8
Pepperdine	5

Final
Cal State Fullerton	2
Arkansas	1

==== Game results ====
Date	Game	Winner	Score	Loser	Notes
June 1	Game 1	Arkansas	5–4	Pepperdine	
June 1	Game 2	Arizona	5–1	Miami (FL)	
June 2	Game 3	Texas	11–5	Connecticut	
June 2	Game 4	Mississippi State	6–1	Cal State Fullerton	
June 2	Game 5	Pepperdine	9–3	Miami (FL)	Miami eliminated
June 3	Game 6	Cal State Fullerton	8–3	Connecticut	Connecticut eliminated
June 3	Game 7	Arkansas	10–3	Arizona	
June 3	Game 8	Texas	8–2	Mississippi State	
June 4	Game 9	Cal State Fullerton	16–3	Arizona	Arizona eliminated
June 4	Game 10	Pepperdine	5–4 (10 innings)	Mississippi State	Mississippi State eliminated
June 5	Game 11	Arkansas	9–4	Texas	
June 6	Game 12	Pepperdine	6–4	Texas	Texas eliminated
June 6	Game 13	Cal State Fullerton	13–10	Arkansas	
June 7	Game 14	Cal State Fullerton	8–5	Pepperdine	Pepperdine eliminated
June 8	Final	Cal State Fullerton	2–1	Arkansas	Cal State Fullerton wins CWS

=== All-Tournament Team ===
The following players were members of the All-Tournament Team.

Position	Player	School
P	Tony Hudson (MOP)	Cal State Fullerton
P	Steve Krueger	Arkansas
C	Kurt Kingsolver	Cal State Fullerton
1B	Tim Wallach	Cal State Fullerton
2B	Mike Gates	Pepperdine
3B	Dan Hanggie	Cal State Fullerton
SS	Larry Wallace	Arkansas
OF	Marc Brumble	Arkansas
OF	Kevin McReynolds	Arkansas
OF	Joseph Bruno	Texas
DH	Keith Walker	Texas

=== Notable players ===
- Arizona: Terry Francona, Craig Lefferts, Brad Mills, John Moses, Jim Scranton, Dwight Taylor
- Arkansas: Kevin McReynolds, Johnny Ray, Ronn Reynolds
- Cal State Fullerton: John Christensen, Andre David, Tim Wallach
- Connecticut:
- Miami (FL): Tony Brewer, Neal Heaton, Ross Jones, Mike Pagliarulo, Dennis Owens
- Mississippi State: Tim Weisheim
- Pepperdine: Mike Gates
- Texas: Jim Acker, Tony Arnold, Joseph Bruno, Keith Creel, Ron Gardenhire,Paul Martin, Jerry Don Gleaton, Andre Robertson, Ricky Wright

== Tournament notes ==
- In the South Regional semifinal Murray State and New Orleans set a tournament record for most combined runs in a game (31).

== See also ==
- 1979 NCAA Division II baseball tournament
- 1979 NCAA Division III baseball tournament
- 1979 NAIA World Series
