= Pepperdine =

Pepperdine may refer to:

== Education ==
- Pepperdine University

== People ==
- Pepperdine (surname)

== Sports ==
- Pepperdine Waves
