= 1979 Connecticut Huskies baseball team =

American college baseball season

1979 Connecticut Huskies baseball

ECAC tournament Champion NCAA Northeast Regional Champion

College World Series, 0–2
- Conference: Eastern College Athletic Conference
- New England
- Record: 31–13 ( ECAC)
- Head coach: Larry Panciera (18th season)
- Home stadium: J.O. Christian Field

1979 Eastern College Athletic Conference baseball standings
	Conf.				Overall
Team	W		L	PCT	W		L	PCT
Metropolitan
Seton Hall ‍‍‍^{y}		–		–	32	–	11	.744
No. 28 St. John's ‍‍‍^{y}		–		–	26	–	11	.703
Fordham ‍‍‍		–		–	18	–	13	.581
Canisius ‍‍‍		–		–	8	–	20	.286
New England
Maine ‍‍‍		–		–	23	–	9	.719
No. 8 Connecticut ‍‍‡‍^{y}		–		–	31	–	13	.705
Fairfield ‍‍‍		–		–	21	–	12	.636
UMass ‍‍‍		–		–	24	–	17	.585
Holy Cross ‍‍‍		–		–	16	–	13	.552
Providence ‍‍‍		–		–	14	–	13	.519
South
George Washington ‍‍‍^{y}		–		–	22	–	9	.710
James Madison ‍‍‍		–		–	31	–	13	.705
Richmond ‍‍‍		–		–	23	–	18	.561
Catholic University ‍‍‍		–		–	16	–	15	.516
Old Dominion ‍‍‍		–		–	16	–	30	.348
Georgetown ‍‍‍		–		–	8	–	23	.258
x – Division champion ‡ – Tournament champion y – Invited to the NCAA tournament As of June 30, 1979; Rankings from Collegiate Baseball

The 1979 Connecticut Huskies baseball team represented the University of Connecticut in the 1979 NCAA Division I baseball season. The Huskies were led by Larry Panciera in his 18th and final year as head coach, and played as part of the Eastern College Athletic Conference, a collection of northeastern universities with no other conference affiliation. Connecticut posted a 31–13 record, won the ECAC, and reached the 1979 College World Series, their fifth appearance in the penultimate college baseball event. The Huskies lost both games in the College World Series, being eliminated by eventual champion Cal State Fullerton.

== Roster ==
1979 Connecticut Huskies roster
- Raymond Bailey; - Steven Cannata; - Thomas Capalbo; - John Chapman; - James Considine; - Joseph Dippel; - Dennis Donovan; - Allan Garray; - Carl Guzzardi; - Robert Hoffer	- Michael Johnson; - Dennis Long; - Mark McMahon; - Tally Noble; - Mike Panciera; - Ben Ruggles; - Richard Tasi; - Joseph Vincente; - Gary Woodfield	Pitchers: 33 - Colin McLaughlin; - Mark Winters; Catchers Infielders Outfielders: - Randy Lavigne

== Schedule ==
1979 Connecticut Huskies baseball game log
Regular season

March
Date	Opponent	Site/stadium	Score	Overall record
Mar 10	at East Carolina	Greenville, NC	W 4–3	1–0
Mar 11	at East Carolina	Greenville, NC	L 0–4	1–1
Mar 12	at East Carolina	Greenville, NC	L 0–5	1–2
Mar 12	at East Carolina	Greenville, NC	L 0–6	1–3
Mar 13	at NC State	Doak Field • Raleigh, NC	W 1–0	2–3
Mar 14	at North Carolina	Boshamer Stadium • Chapel Hill, NC	W 17–8	3–3
Mar 15	at North Carolina	Boshamer Stadium • Chapel Hill, NC	L 3–9	3–4
Mar	at Baltimore	Baltimore, MD	L 2–3	3–5
Mar 24	at St. John's	Queens, NY	W 10–3	4–5
Mar 31	at Iona	New Rochelle, NY	W 26–1	5–5

April
Date	Opponent	Site/stadium	Score	Overall record
Apr 7	New Hampshire	J. O. Christian Field • Storrs, CT	0–3	5–6
Apr 7	New Hampshire	J. O. Christian Field • Storrs, CT	W 11–5	6–6
Apr 11	Dartmouth	J. O. Christian Field • Storrs, CT	W 1–0	7–6
Apr 17	Providence	J. O. Christian Field • Storrs, CT	W 9–1	8–6
Apr 18	at Rhode Island	Bill Beck Field • Kingston, RI	W 3–0	9–6
Apr 18	at Rhode Island	Bill Beck Field • Kingston, RI	W 9–1	10–6
Apr 19	at Northeastern	Parsons Field • Brookline, MA	W 4–2	11–6
Apr 21	UMass	J. O. Christian Field • Storrs, CT	W 3–2	12–6
Apr 21	UMass	J. O. Christian Field • Storrs, CT	L 0–3	12–7
Apr 22	Fairfield	J. O. Christian Field • Storrs, CT	W 5–4	13–7
Apr 23	at Boston College	Chestnut Hill, MA	W 18–9	14–7
Apr 24	Brown	J. O. Christian Field • Storrs, CT	W 12–5	15–7
Apr 24	Brown	J. O. Christian Field • Storrs, CT	W 5–3	16–7
Apr 25	at Providence	Providence, RI	W 8–4	17–7
Apr 28	Vermont	J. O. Christian Field • Storrs, CT	W 6–5	18–7
Apr 28	Vermont	J. O. Christian Field • Storrs, CT	W 6–3	19–7
Apr 29	Northeastern	J. O. Christian Field • Storrs, CT	W 6–5	20–7

May
Date	Opponent	Site/stadium	Score	Overall record
May 2	at UMass	Earl Lorden Field • Amherst, MA	W 6–1	21–7
May 3	at Holy Cross	Fitton Field • Worcester, MA	W 1–0	22–7
May 5	at Maine	Fitton Field • Worcester, MA	L 0–7	22–8
May 5	at Maine	Orono, ME	L 1–5	22–9
May 7	Fairfield	J. O. Christian Field • Storrs, CT	W 8–7	23–9

Post-season

ECAC Tournament
Date	Opponent	Site/stadium	Score	Overall record	ECACT Record
May 18	Fairfield	Fitton Field • Worcester, MA	L 1–2	23–10	0–1
May 18	Maine	Fitton Field • Worcester, MA	W 4–0	24–10	1–1
May 19	Fairfield	Fitton Field • Worcester, MA	W 12–2	25–10	2–1
May 20	UMass	Fitton Field • Worcester, MA	W 14–10	26–10	3–1
May 20	UMass	Fitton Field • Worcester, MA	W 8–1	27–10	4–1

NCAA tournament: Northeast Regional
Date	Opponent	Site/stadium	Score	Overall record	Regional record
May 25	at Navy	Max Bishop Stadium • Annapolis, MD	W 5–4	28–10	1–0
May 26	St. John's	Max Bishop Stadium • Annapolis, MD	L 3–6	28–11	1–1
May 27	Nebraska	Max Bishop Stadium • Annapolis, MD	W 15–0	29–11	2–1
May 27	St. John's	Max Bishop Stadium • Annapolis, MD	W 14–4	30–11	3–1
May 28	St. John's	Max Bishop Stadium • Annapolis, MD	W 4–0	31–11	4–1

College World Series
Date	Opponent	Site/stadium	Score	Overall record	CWS record
June 1	Texas	Johnny Rosenblatt Stadium • Omaha, NE	L 5–11	31–12	0–1
June 2	Cal State Fullerton	Johnny Rosenblatt Stadium • Omaha, NE	L 3–8	31–13	0–2
