= Pepperdine (surname) =

Pepperdine is an English surname. Notable people with the surname include:

- George Pepperdine (1886–1962), philanthropist and founder of Pepperdine University
- Vicki Pepperdine (born 1961), English actress
