= Sierra Unified School District =

School district in California, United States

Location
- 29143 Auberry Rd. Prather, California 93651 United States

District information
- Grades: pre-k-Adult
- Established: 1923
- Schools: 1 elementary K–6, 1 junior high 7–8, 1 senior high 9–12, plus an alternative education center with a high school 9–12, a community day school (4–8), an elementary school (K–8), and adult education

Students and staff
- Students: ~2500
- Teachers: ~70

Other information
- Website: sierrausd.org//

Sierra Unified School District is a public school district based in Fresno County, California, United States. As of 2025, the superintendent is Lori Grace.

Several areas are in the district for all grades PreK-12. They include the majority of the Auberry census-designated place and a piece of Millerton CDP. Several areas are only in the district for grades 9-12. They include the rest of Auberry CDP, as well as Big Creek and Shaver Lake CDPs.
