= Jim Scranton =

American baseball player (born 1960)

- Shortstop
- Born: April 5, 1960 (age 66); Torrance, California, U.S.
- Batted: Right Threw: Right

MLB debut
- September 5, 1984, for the Kansas City Royals

Last MLB appearance
- October 6, 1985, for the Kansas City Royals

MLB statistics
- Batting average: .000
- Games played: 8
- Runs scored: 1
- Stats at Baseball Reference

Teams
- Kansas City Royals (1984–1985)

James Dean Scranton (born April 5, 1960) is an American former Major League Baseball infielder. He played briefly for the Kansas City Royals in 1984 and 1985. Scranton played in eight games in the majors, 6 as a shortstop, 1 as a third baseman, and one as a pinch-runner. Scranton never had a hit, going 0-for-6, but did score as a pinch runner.

Scranton played in the minor leagues from 1980 until 1986, all in the Royals organization. He was originally drafted by the Oakland Athletics in 1978, but never signed with them, instead signing as a free agent with the Royals in 1980.

Scranton graduated from Elsinore High School and has Japanese heritage.
