= Kevin McReynolds =

American baseball player (born 1959)

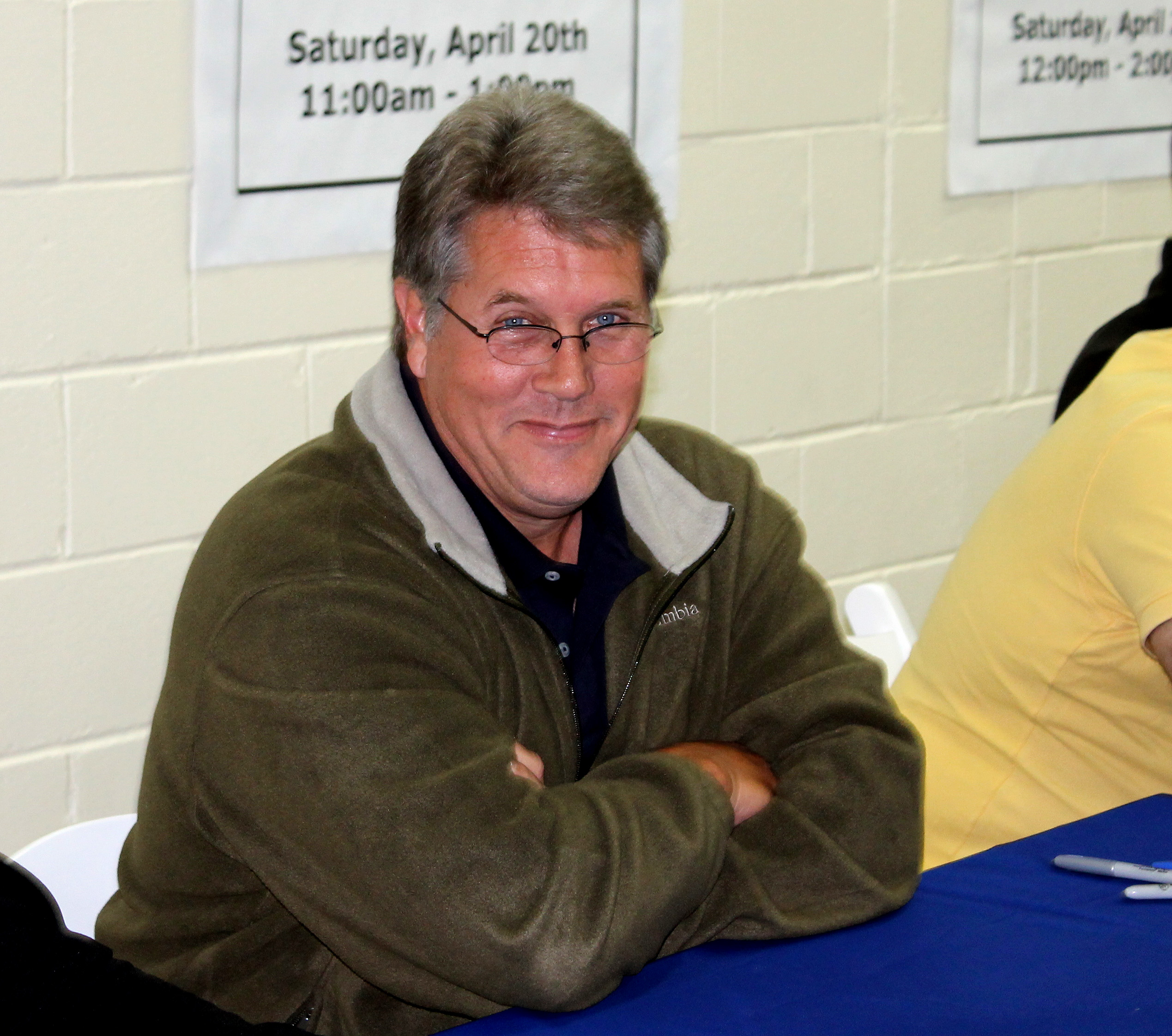
- McReynolds in 2013
- Left fielder / Center fielder
- Born: October 16, 1959 (age 66); Little Rock, Arkansas, U.S.
- Batted: Right Threw: Right

MLB debut
- June 2, 1983, for the San Diego Padres

Last MLB appearance
- August 11, 1994, for the New York Mets

MLB statistics
- Batting average: .265
- Home runs: 211
- Runs batted in: 807
- Stats at Baseball Reference

Teams
- San Diego Padres (1983–1986); New York Mets (1987–1991); Kansas City Royals (1992–1993); New York Mets (1994)

Walter Kevin McReynolds (born October 16, 1959) is an American former professional baseball player who was an outfielder with a 12-year career in Major League Baseball (MLB) from 1983 to 1994. A two-time All-America from the University of Arkansas, he played for the San Diego Padres and New York Mets of the National League and the Kansas City Royals of the American League.

== Early life ==
McReynolds was born in Little Rock, Arkansas.

=== High school ===
He attended Sylvan Hills High School in Sherwood, Arkansas, where he played baseball. McReynolds was said to be one of the best high school players in Arkansas. McReynolds proved that by hitting .638, 15 home runs, and had 60 RBIs during the first 25 games of his senior year. He led his Bears team to the Arkansas Class AAA State Baseball Championship and was tournament MVP in 1978. McReynolds was named the 1978 Arkansas High School Baseball Player of the Year.

In 2011, McReynolds became the school's first inductee to the National High School Hall of Fame.

=== College ===
McReynolds was drafted by the Milwaukee Brewers after his senior year of high school, but chose to attend the University of Arkansas where he played outfield for the Razorbacks under scholarship. At Arkansas, McReynolds proved that the Razorbacks made a good move in giving him that scholarship. In his freshman year, McReynolds hit for a .282 batting average with eight home runs and 37 RBIs. That year Arkansas came in second in the College World Series in which McReynolds hit for a .566 batting average, with two home runs, two doubles and five RBIs. McReynolds got better as his college career progressed. In his junior year, McReynolds hit for a .386 batting average with 17 home runs and 57 RBIs as the Razorbacks finished second in the league and received a berth in the NCAA tournament.

== Professional playing career ==
=== San Diego Padres (1981–1986) ===
==== Minor Leagues ====
The San Diego Padres selected McReynolds with the sixth pick in the first round of the 1981 Major League Baseball draft. He played in the minor leagues from 1981 to 1983. McReynolds played for the Class A-Advanced Reno Padres in Nevada, the Double-A Amarillo Gold Sox in Texas, and then the Triple-A Las Vegas Stars. In 1983, during his time in Las Vegas, McReynolds won the Pacific Coast League MVP.

==== Major League debut ====
McReynolds made his major league debut for the Padres on June 2, 1983, against the Philadelphia Phillies; he hit a home run in his fourth at-bat. McReynolds finished the season with a .221 batting average, 4 home runs, and 14 RBIs.

==== Padres (1984–1986) ====
In 1984, the Padres reached the World Series for the first time in franchise history. McReynolds along with rookie outfielder Carmelo Martínez was hyped as the M&M Boys after the New York Yankees 1960s power-hitting duo of Mickey Mantle and Roger Maris. McReynolds shared the team lead for home runs with 20 and Martinez was fourth on the team with 66 RBIs. During the 1984 National League Championship Series (NLCS) McReynolds had a .300 batting average, hit 1 home run and 4 RBIs. However, he broke his wrist trying to break up a double play in Game 4, and was out for the rest of the Padres' post-season. The Padres won Game 5 and advanced to the World Series, losing 4–1 to the Detroit Tigers. McReynolds recovered from the wrist injury and played two solid seasons for the Padres in 1985 and 1986.

=== New York Mets (1987–1991) ===
On December 11, 1986, the Padres traded McReynolds, Gene Walter, and Adam Ging to the New York Mets for Kevin Mitchell, Shawn Abner, Stan Jefferson, Kevin Armstrong, and Kevin Brown. There, McReynolds continued to flourish. His best season came in 1988, as McReynolds tied his career high batting average at .288 and set career highs in RBIs with 99 and stolen bases with 21, which set a Major League Baseball record for stolen bases without being caught stealing; the record was broken by Chase Utley in 2009. That year, McReynolds came in third in the MVP voting behind Kirk Gibson and Darryl Strawberry.

In 1988, the Mets made it to the NLCS against the Los Angeles Dodgers. McReynolds played fairly well in the series, batting .250 with 2 home runs and 4 RBIs. In Game 1, McReynolds collided with Dodgers catcher Mike Scioscia. This brought attention to McReynolds, who was known for not wanting attention. McReynolds stayed out of the headlines for the rest of the series as the Mets lost the series, four games to three.

=== Kansas City Royals (1992–1993) ===
On December 6, 1991, the Mets traded McReynolds, along with Gregg Jefferies and Keith Miller, to the Kansas City Royals for Bret Saberhagen. During his two years with the Royals, McReynolds hit a combined batting average of .246, hit 24 home runs and 91 RBIs.

=== Back to the Mets (1994) ===
On January 5, 1994, McReynolds was traded back to the Mets for Vince Coleman, after Coleman started a controversy in New York. McReynolds played his last year of baseball for the Mets, hitting .256 with 4 home runs and 21 RBIs. On October 25, 1994, McReynolds was granted free agency and ended his 12-year baseball career.

== Personal life ==
McReynolds and his ex-wife Jackie McReynolds married in 1987 and had two daughters together. McReynolds is an avid duck hunter and fisherman. After retiring, McReynolds built the Kevin McReynolds Sports Complex near Sylvan Hills High School. McReynolds also ran a commercial duck-hunting club in southeast Arkansas.

== Achievements ==
- Inductee, SEC Baseball Legends (2012, inaugural class)
- Inductee, National High School Hall of Fame (2011)
- Inductee, Arkansas Sports Hall of Fame (1996)
- National League Player of the Month (September 1988)
- Major League Baseball record for most steals in a season (21) without being caught (1988, since surpassed)
- Pacific Coast League Most Valuable Player Award (1983)
- Bill Dickey Award (1980)
- National Baseball Congress World Series MVP Alaska Goldpanners of Fairbanks (1980)
- NCAA College World Series All-Tournament Team (1979)
- Arkansas High School Baseball Player of the Year (1978)
- Arkansas Class AAA State Baseball Championship / Tournament MVP (1978)

== See also ==
- List of Major League Baseball players to hit for the cycle

Awards and achievements
Preceded by Eric Davis	National League Player of the Month; September, 1988	Succeeded by Von Hayes
Preceded by Eric Davis	Hitting for the cycle August 1, 1989	Succeeded by Gary Redus
