= Andre Robertson =

American baseball player (born 1957)

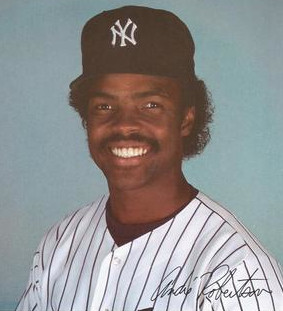
- Robertson in 1984
- Second baseman / Shortstop
- Born: October 2, 1957 (age 69); Orange, Texas, U.S.
- Batted: Right Threw: Right

MLB debut
- September 3, 1981, for the New York Yankees

Last MLB appearance
- October 6, 1985, for the New York Yankees

MLB statistics
- Batting average: .251
- Runs: 80
- Hits: 182
- Stats at Baseball Reference

Teams
- New York Yankees (1981–1985)

Andre Levett Robertson (born October 2, 1957) is an American former baseball second baseman and shortstop. He played five seasons for the New York Yankees of Major League Baseball (MLB). He was signed by the Toronto Blue Jays in the 4th round of the 1979 June Amateur Draft. Robertson played his first professional season with their Class A-Advanced Dunedin Blue Jays and Triple-A Syracuse Chiefs in 1979, and his last with the Texas Rangers' Triple-A Oklahoma City 89ers in 1989. He was once a highly touted prospect in the Yankees' organization, but a 1983 car accident left him with a broken neck and other injuries, and he never regained his skills.
