= Tony Hudson =

- Pitcher
- Born: June 29, 1958 (age 68)
- Bats: Right Throws: Right

Career highlights and awards
- College World Series Most Outstanding Player (1979)

Anthony Lamont Hudson (born June 29, 1958) is an American former pitcher who is most notable for winning the 1979 College World Series Most Outstanding Player award while a sophomore at California State University, Fullerton. He is one of five players from the Fullerton State Titans to win that award. The others are John Fishel, Phil Nevin, Mark Kotsay and Jason Windsor.

In 1979, he was drafted by the St. Louis Cardinals in the 17th round. However, he chose not to sign. However, when he was selected by the Texas Rangers in the seventh round of the 1980 draft, he did sign. He played professionally until 1987, however he never reached the majors. During his professional career, he was mostly used as a relief pitcher.

In 1980, he played for the Tulsa Drillers, appearing in 14 games (13 starts), and going 5–4 with a 4.68 earned run average (ERA). He played for both Tulsa and the Asheville Tourists in 1981, going 2–5 with a 5.58 ERA in 16 games (six starts) for the Tourists and 2–3 with a 4.11 ERA in six games (all starts) for the Drillers.

He spent the 1982 season with the Denver Bears and Burlington Rangers. He appeared in only two games for the Bears, going 0–0 with a 2.45 ERA. For the Rangers, he made 43 relief appearances, going 6–1 with a 1.92 ERA.

Splitting the 1983 season between the Bears and Drillers, Hudson went 5–4 with a 4.91 ERA in 23 games. In 29 games for the Drillers, he went 2–3 with a 7.20 ERA. He spent 1984 with the Salem Redbirds, going 7–5 with a 3.71 ERA in 39 games (nine starts).

Back with Tulsa in 1985, Hudson went 8–4 with a 2.17 ERA in 51 games. He pitched the final two seasons of his professional career in the Toronto Blue Jays organization. In 1986, he played for the Syracuse Chiefs and Knoxville Blue Jays. He went 2–3 with a 4.70 ERA in 28 games with the Chiefs and 2–1 with a 2.12 ERA in 23 games with the Blue Jays. He wrapped up his career in 1987, playing for the Knoxville Blue Jays again. He went 5–5 with a 4.59 ERA in 40 games that season.
