= Southern California Baseball Association =

College sports conference, 1977–1984

The Southern California Baseball Association or SCBA was a baseball-only conference that existed from 1977 to 1984. It was made up of schools from the Big West Conference, then known as the Pacific Coast Athletic Association (PCAA), and West Coast Conference, then known as the West Coast Athletic Conference (WCAC). In 1977, the PCAA and WCAC realigned themselves for baseball only into a north conference (NCBA) and south conference (SCBA). In the league's inaugural season there were seven teams. The next year, UC Irvine joined, and from then until the demise of the conference the membership stood at eight schools. San Diego State left after the 1978 season but was immediately replaced by San Diego, and Cal State Los Angeles left after the next-to-last season of 1983 and was replaced for the league's final season by UNLV, the only non-California member in SCBA history. The SCBA was dominated by Cal State Fullerton who won the league title all eight seasons, while competing in four College World Series and claiming their first two national titles.

== Member schools ==
Institution	Location (Note: All cities are located within the State of California, unless noted in parentheses the state where the institution is located by that city.)	Founded	Affiliation	Nickname	Joined (Note: Represents the calendar year when fall sports competition begins.)	Left (Note: Represents the calendar year when spring sports competition ends.)	Primary conference for other sports at the moment	NCAA baseball tournament appearances	CWS appearances
California State University, Fullerton (Cal State Fullerton)	Fullerton	1957	Public	Titans	1976	1984	Pacific Coast (PCAA) (Note: Currently known as the Big West Conference (BWC).)	32	17
California State University, Los Angeles (Cal State Los Angeles)	Los Angeles	1947	Public	Golden Eagles	1976	1983	California (CCAA) (Note: Currently an NCAA Division II athletic conference.)	4	1
California State University, Long Beach (Long Beach State)	Long Beach	1949	Public	49ers	1976	1984	Pacific Coast (PCAA)	18	4
Loyola Marymount University	Los Angeles	1911	Catholic (Jesuit)	Lions	1976	1984	West Coast (WCAC) (Note: Currently known as the West Coast Conference (WCC).)	8	1
Pepperdine University	Malibu	1937	Churches of Christ	Waves	1976	1984	West Coast (WCAC)	25	2
University of San Diego	San Diego	1949	Catholic (Diocese of San Diego)	Toreros	1978	1984	West Coast (WCAC)	6	0
San Diego State University	San Diego	1897	Public	Aztecs	1976	1978	Pacific Coast (PCAA) (Note: Later left to join the Western Athletic Conference (WAC); now currently in the Mountain West Conference (MW).)	9	0
University of California, Irvine (UC Irvine)	Irvine	1965	Public	Anteaters	1977	1984	Pacific Coast (PCAA)	9	2
University of California, Santa Barbara (UC Santa Barbara)	Santa Barbara	1891	Public	Gauchos	1976	1984	Pacific Coast (PCAA)	7	0
University of Nevada, Las Vegas (UNLV)	Las Vegas (Nevada)	1957	Public	Rebels	1983	1984	Pacific Coast (PCAA) (Note: Now currently in the Mountain West Conference (MW).)	10	0
