= Farmdale =

Farmdale may refer to:

- Farmdale, Ohio
- Farmdale, West Virginia
- Farmdale (Los Angeles Metro station)
