= Pepperdine Waves baseball =

- 2026 Pepperdine Waves baseball team
- Founded: 1939; 87 years ago
- University: Pepperdine University
- Head coach: Tyler LaTorre (2nd season)
- Conference: West Coast Conference
- Location: Malibu, California
- Home stadium: Eddy D. Field Stadium (capacity: 2,000)
- Nickname: Waves
- Colors: Blue, white, and orange

College World Series champions
- 1992

College World Series appearances
- 1979, 1992

NCAA regional champions
- 1979, 1992, 2014

NCAA tournament appearances
- 1955, 1957, 1974, 1975, 1976, 1979, 1982, 1985, 1986, 1987, 1988, 1989, 1991, 1992, 1993, 1995, 1999, 2001, 2003, 2004, 2005, 2006, 2007, 2008, 2012, 2014, 2015

Conference tournament champions
- 2014, 2015

Conference regular season champions
- 1974, 1975, 1976, 1985, 1986, 1987, 1988, 1989, 1991, 1992, 1993, 1995, 2001, 2004, 2005, 2006, 2012, 2014

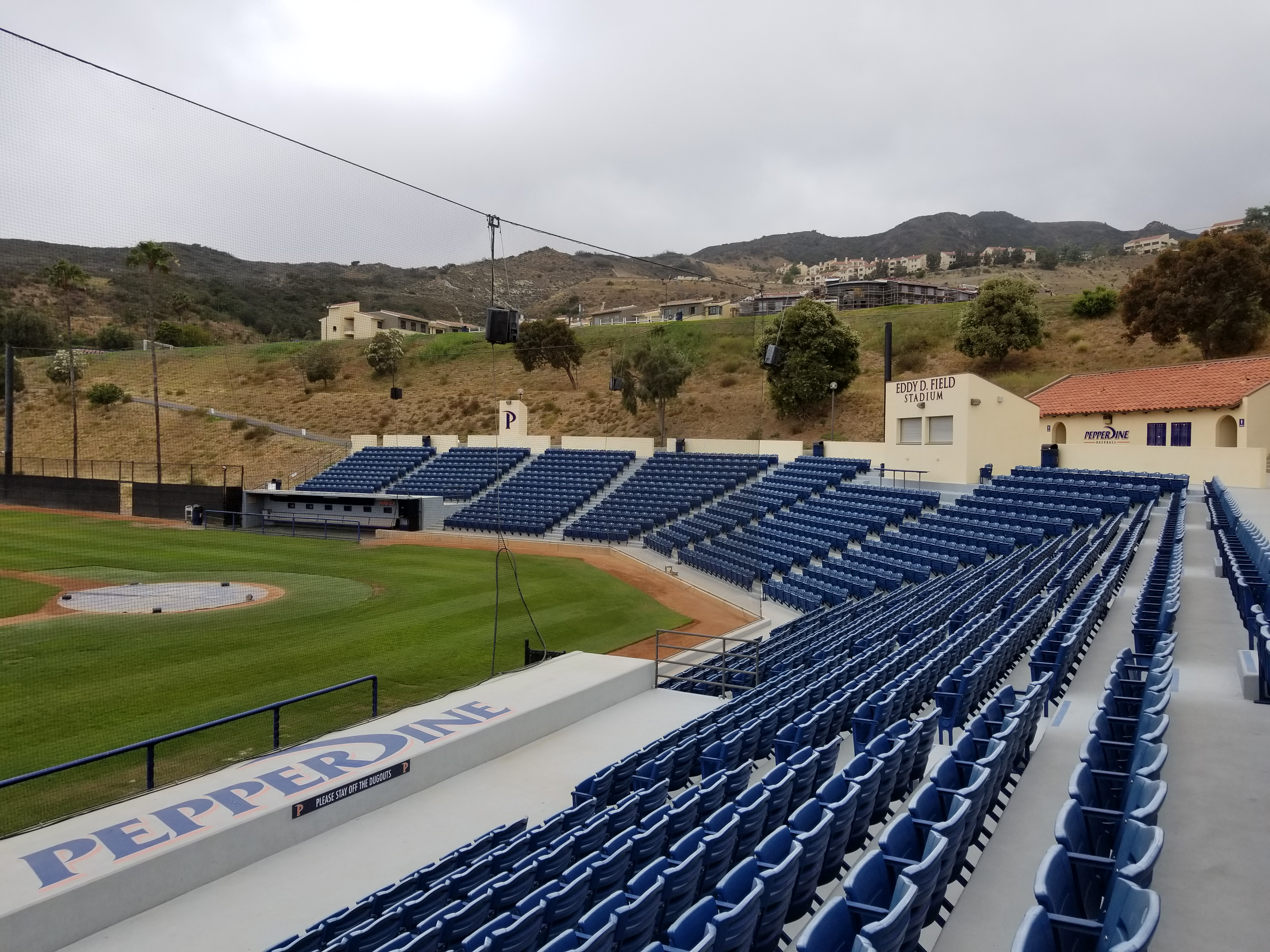
Eddy D. Field Stadium

The Pepperdine Waves baseball team represents Pepperdine University in the sport of baseball. The Pepperdine Waves compete in Division I of the National Collegiate Athletic Association (NCAA) and in the West Coast Conference. They are currently led by head coach Tyler LaTorre.

The Waves have been to the College World Series twice, winning the national championship in 1992 under head coach Andy Lopez with a win over Cal State Fullerton.

== Head coaches ==
Coach	Tenure	Record	Pct.
Wade Ruby	1939	8–10	.444
Benny Lefebvre	1940–1941; 1962	27–33	.450
Morris Ruby	1942	4–8	.333
Shan Deniston	1944	2–10	.167
Clarence Shaffer	1945	9–4	.692
John Scolinos	1946–1960	263–219	.546
Walter Glass	1961	12–19	.387
Gary Marks	1963–1967	75–96	.439
Gail Hopkins	1968	9–28	.243
Wayne Wright	1969–1976	195–166–3	.540
Bob Zuber	1977–1978	59–45–4	.565
Dave Gorrie	1979–1988	409–202–11	.666
Andy Lopez	1989–1994	241–107–3	.691
Pat Harrison	1995–1996	69–38–1	.644
Frank Sanchez	1997–2003	257–161	.615
Steve Rodriguez	2004–2015	299–229	.566
Rick Hirtensteiner	2016–2024	194–226	.462
Tyler LaTorre	2025–present	0–0	

== Year-by-year results ==
Season	Coach	Record		Postseason
Season	Coach	Overall	Conference	Postseason
1939	Wade Ruby	8-10	—	—
1940	Benny Lefebvre	5-9	—	—
1941	Benny Lefebvre	5-9	—	—
1942	Maurice Ruby	4-8	—	—
1943	No team			
1944	Shan Deniston	2-10	—	—
1945	Clarence Shaffer	9-4	—	—
1946	John Scolinos	17-8	—	—
1947	John Scolinos	18-16	—	—
1948	John Scolinos	17-14	—	—
1949	John Scolinos	12-9	—	—
1950	John Scolinos	22-18	—	—
1951	John Scolinos	23-15	—	—
1952	John Scolinos	11-15	—	—
1953	John Scolinos	15-16	—	—
1954	John Scolinos	17-10	—	—
1955	John Scolinos	19-12	—	NCAA tournament
1956	John Scolinos	15-23	—	—
1957	John Scolinos	19-14	—	NCAA tournament
1958	John Scolinos	16-17	—	—
1959	John Scolinos	13-20	—	—
1960	John Scolinos	29-12	—	NCAA tournament
1961	Walter Glass	12-19	—	—
1962	Benny Lefebvre	17-15	—	—
1963	Gary Marks	26-8	—	—
1964	Gary Marks	11-25	—	—
1965	Gary Marks	17-17	—	—
1966	Gary Marks	12-25	—	—
1967	Gary Marks	9-21	—	—
West Coast Conference
1968	Gail Hopkins	9-28	6-14	—
1969	Wayne Wright	9-31-2	3-17	—
1970	Wayne Wright	20-22	9-12	—
1971	Wayne Wright	20-24	8-13	—
1972	Wayne Wright	24-17	11-7	—
1973	Wayne Wright	17-28	7-11	—
1974	Wayne Wright	38-12	15-3	NCAA tournament
1975	Wayne Wright	37-13	14-2	NCAA Regional
1976	Wayne Wright	29-19-1	16-2	NCAA Regional
Southern California Baseball Association
1977	Bob Zuber	23-27-2	12-11	—
1978	Bob Zuber	36-18-2	20-8	—
1979	Dave Gorrie	53-18	19-9	College World Series (3rd place)
1980	Dave Gorrie	30-25-2	17-11	—
1981	Dave Gorrie	31-25-2	14-14	—
1982	Dave Gorrie	46-21-1	21-7	NCAA Regional
1983	Dave Gorrie	33-20-1	15-13	—
1984	Dave Gorrie	41-21	16-12	—
West Coast Conference
1985	Dave Gorrie	52-15-1	20-4	NCAA Regional
1986	Dave Gorrie	38-21-2	19-5	NCAA Regional
1987	Dave Gorrie	48-12-3	22-2	NCAA Regional
1988	Dave Gorrie	37-24-1	19-4-1	NCAA Regional
1989	Andy Lopez	41-19-1	20-4	NCAA Regional
1990	Andy Lopez	37-23	24-12	—
1991	Andy Lopez	41-17	25-10	NCAA Regional
1992	Andy Lopez	48-11-1	23-4	College World Series Champions
1993	Andy Lopez	41-17	24-6	NCAA Regional
1994	Andy Lopez	33-20	20-10	—
1995	Pat Harrison	36-19-1	23-3-1	NCAA Regional
1996	Pat Harrison	33-19	20-8	—
1997	Frank Sanchez	34-25	20-8	—
1998	Frank Sanchez	32-22	21-9	—
1999	Frank Sanchez	46-16	21-9	NCAA Regional
2000	Frank Sanchez	36-23	22-8	—
2001	Frank Sanchez	42-18	25-5	NCAA Regional
2002	Frank Sanchez	31-32	18-12	—
2003	Frank Sanchez	36-25	23-7	NCAA Regional
2004	Steve Rodriguez	30-32	19-11	NCAA Regional
2005	Steve Rodriguez	41-23	21-9	NCAA Regional
2006	Steve Rodriguez	42-21	15-6	NCAA Regional
2007	Steve Rodriguez	35-22	14-7	NCAA Regional
2008	Steve Rodriguez	38-21	14-6	NCAA Regional
2009	Steve Rodriguez	31-23	12-9	—
2010	Steve Rodriguez	24-30	12-9	—
2011	Steve Rodriguez	22-34	7-14	—
2012	Steve Rodriguez	36-23	16-8	NCAA Regional
2013	Steve Rodriguez	27-23	13-11	—
2014	Steve Rodriguez	42-16	18-9	NCAA Super Regional
2015	Steve Rodriguez	30-27	17-10	NCAA Regional
2016	Rick Hirtensteiner	29-24	16-11	—
2017	Rick Hirtensteiner	20-32	8-19	—
2018	Rick Hirtensteiner	31-24	17-10	—
2019	Rick Hirtensteiner	24-25	14-13	—

== Pepperdine in the NCAA tournament ==
- The NCAA Division I baseball tournament started in 1947.
- The format of the tournament has changed through the years.

Year	Record	Pct	Notes
1955	1–2	.333	Eliminated by Fresno State in the District 8 playoffs
1957	3–3	.500	Eliminated by California in the District 8 playoffs
1960	0-2	.000	Eliminated by Southern California in the District 8 playoffs
1974	1–2	.333	Eliminated by Southern California in the District 8 playoffs
1975	3–2	.600	Eliminated by Cal State Fullerton in West Regional
1976	1–2	.333	Eliminated by Cal State Fullerton in West Regional
1979	6–2	.750	Won the Mideast Regional; College World Series
1982	2–2	.500	Eliminated by Stanford in West I Regional
1985	3–2	.600	Eliminated by Stanford in West I Regional
1986	3–2	.600	Eliminated by Arizona in Central Regional
1987	2–2	.500	Eliminated by UCLA in West II Regional
1988	3–2	.600	Eliminated by Arizona State in West II Regional
1989	0–2	.000	Eliminated by Wichita State in West II Regional
1991	0–2	.000	Eliminated by Southern California in West I Regional
1992	8–1	.889	Won the West Regional; College World Series champions
1993	1–2	.333	Eliminated by St. John's in the West II Regional
1995	2–2	.500	Eliminated by Long Beach State in the West Regional
1999	3–2	.600	Eliminated by Southern California in the Los Angeles Regional
2001	1–2	.333	Eliminated by Fresno State in the Los Angeles Regional
2003	0–2	.000	Eliminated by Minnesota in the Long Beach Regional
2004	2–2	.500	Eliminated by Cal State Fullerton in the Fullerton Regional
2005	3–2	.600	Eliminated by Southern California in the Long Beach Regional
2006	2–2	.500	Eliminated by Missouri in the Malibu Regional
2007	0–2	.000	Eliminated by Long Beach State in the Long Beach Regional
2008	2–2	.500	Eliminated by Stanford in the Palo Alto Regional
2012	2–2	.500	Eliminated by Stanford in the Palo Alto Regional
2014	4–2	.667	Won the San Luis Obispo Regional; Eliminated by TCU in the Fort Worth Super Regional
2015	2–2	.500	Eliminated by Cal State Fullerton in the Fullerton Regional

== Individual awards ==
A number of Pepperdine players have earned individual honors, including All-American honors, All-College World Series honors, and West Coast Conference honors.

=== All-Americans ===
- 1979

Mike Gates, 2B

- 1982

Jon Furman, P

- 1985

Brad Bierley, OF
Scott Marrett, P

- 1987

Paul Faries, SS

- 1989

Rick Hirtensteiner, OF

- 1990

Steve Duda, P (Freshman)
Steve Rodriguez, 2B (Freshman)

- 1991

Pat Ahearne, P
Steve Montgomery, P
Steve Rodriguez, 2B

- 1992

Pat Ahearne, P
Dan Melendez, 1B
Steve Montgomery, P
Steve Rodriguez, 2B

- 1993

Steve Duda, P

- 1995

Ryan Christenson, OF

- 1997

Randy Wolf, P
Steve Schenewerk, P (Freshman)

- 1999

Jay Adams, P
Jay Gehrke, P
Dane Sardinha, C
Dan Haren, P (Freshman)

- 2000

Dane Sardinha, C

- 2001

Dan Haren, P
Noah Lowry, P
Jared Pitney, 1B

- 2003

David Uribes, SS (Freshman)

- 2004

Chad Tracy, C (Freshman)

- 2005

Steve Kleen, P
Chad Tracy, C
Barry Enright, P (Freshman)

- 2006

Chase d'Arnaud, P (Freshman)
Brett Hunter, P (Freshman)

- 2007

Barry Enright, P

- 2008

Eric Thames, OF

- 2009

Cole Cook, P (Freshman)

- 2016

A. J. Puckett, P

=== All College World Series ===
- 1979

Mike Gates, 2B

- 1992

Pat Ahearne, P
Dan Melendez, 1B
Steve Rodriguez, 2B
Scott Vollmer, C

=== Brooks Wallace Award ===
- 2012

Zach Vincej, SS

=== Conference awards ===
West Coast Conference Player of the Year
Mark Lee - 1976
Brad Bierley - 1985
Steve Erickson & Paul Faries - 1987
Rick Hirtensteiner - 1989
Steve Rodriguez - 1992
Ryan Christenson - 1995
Dane Sardinha - 2000
Dan Haren - 2001
Kevin Estrada - 2003
Chad Tracy - 2005
Eric Thames - 2008
Joe Sever - 2012

West Coast Conference Pitcher of the Year
Scott Marrett - 1985
Mike Fetters - 1986
Doug Simons - 1988
Britt Craven - 1989 & 1990
Pat Ahearne - 1992
Steve Duda - 1993
Randy Wolf - 1997
Jay Adams - 1999
Noah Lowry - 2001
Greg Ramirez - 2003
Paul Coleman - 2005
Barry Enright - 2006
A. J. Puckett - 2016

== Waves in Major League Baseball ==
The following Pepperdine players have played in Major League Baseball:

Pat Ahearne
Bill Bathe
Ryan Christenson
Chase d'Arnaud
Barry Enright
Paul Faries
Mike Fetters
Danny Garcia
Mike Gates
Dan Haren
Gail Hopkins
Matt Howard

Chad Kreuter
Jalal Leach
Mark Lee
Noah Lowry
David Matranga
Steve Montgomery
Jon Moscot
David Newhan
Will Ohman
John Peck
Rob Picciolo
Ryan Radmanovich
Steve Rodriguez

Dane Sardinha
Mike Scott
Doug Simons
Andy Stankiewicz
Eric Thames
Jason Thompson
Derek Wallace
Matt Wise
Randy Wolf
Danny Worth

Former Wave player Chad Tracy was named interim manager of the Boston Red Sox in April 2026.

== See also ==
- List of NCAA Division I baseball programs
