= Dave Gorrie =

- Born: October 15, 1930; Olney, Texas, U.S.
- Died: May 16, 2015 (aged 84); Bedford, Texas, U.S.
- Occupation: Baseball Coach
- Known for: Head Coach for UC Santa Barbara 1960–1977, Head Coach for Pepperdine University 1978–1988, Hitting Coach for Panola JC 1996–2009

Dave Gorrie (October 15, 1930 – May 16, 2015) was a college baseball coach. He served as the head coach at the University of California, Santa Barbara from 1960 to 1978 and at Pepperdine University from 1979 to 1988. He coached the Pepperdine Wave to the 1979 College World Series, where they placed third. Gorrie finished his career as a private hitting instructor and a volunteer hitting coach at Panola Junior College in Carthage, Texas.

== Playing career ==
In the 1951, Dave and his brothers, Dick and Doug all played in the backfield of Santa Barbara College (the name of UC-Santa Barbara prior to 1958). Dave was fullback, Dick was quarterback and Doug was halfback. Gorrie then went on to play running back in the Armed Forces. He was signed to the Kansas City Athletic's farm system to play baseball in 1956. He played for the Seminole Oilers of the Sooner State League compiling 457 at bats in 128 games hitting .278 with 4 home runs. In '57, he played for the Crowley Millers of the Evangeline League and Columbia Gems of the South Atlantic League. For the year, Gorrie hit .287 with 10 home runs. 58' found Gorrie playing for the Rochester/Winona A's of the Illinois-Indiana-Iowa League where he hit .291 with 9 home runs. He was offered a AAA contract with Portland the following year, but decided to get his master's at USC and then accepted the coaching position at UCSB.

== Coaching career ==
Gorrie began his coaching career at UC-Santa Barbara in 1960 and compiled a 343–370–1 (.481) record. In 1972, he led the Gauchos to a 1st place finish in the Southern California Baseball Association (SCBA) conference with a 31–16 overall record going 14–4 in conference. UCSB lost to eventual national champion USC in the regional final. He is still the longest tenured Head Coach in Gauchos history with 18 seasons; however, current Head Coach, Bob Brontsema is only two years behind him as of 2009. Gorrie was inducted into the Gauchos Hall of Fame in 1975. Major leaguers who played at least one season for Gorrie at UCSB were Chris Speier, Brian Kingman, and Greg Shanahan.

Gorrie began his career at Pepperdine in 1979, leading the Waves to a third place finish in the College World Series. This was the school's first ever appearance. His 1979 team still holds the school record for wins in a season with 53. After 10 seasons, Gorrie retired with a 409–202–11 (.666) career record. Players who went on to Major League careers after playing for Gorrie include Mike Gates, Bill Bathe, Chad Kreuter, Mike Fetters, Paul Faries, Doug Simons, Andy Stankiewicz, Matt Howard, and Jalal Leach.

Gorrie was inducted into the Waves Hall of Fame in 1988. In January 1990, Gorrie was inducted into the American Baseball Coaches Association (ABCA) Hall of Fame. He was presented by former player, Mike Simpson.

In 1996, Gorrie became the volunteer hitting coach at Panola Junior College in Carthage, Texas. At Panola, he coached three professional hitters: Cody Rogers, Bobby Wagner, and Chad Beck as well as numerous division I college players.

In 2008, Coach Gorrie was diagnosed with Alzheimer's disease. He continued private hitting instruction for an additional year before fully retiring.

In 2012, Dave and his wife Linda moved from Carthage to Bedford, Texas.

David Franklin Gorrie died on May 16, 2015.
