= Michelle and Barack Obama Sports Complex =

Sports complex in Baldwin Hills, LA, USA

Obama Sports Complex
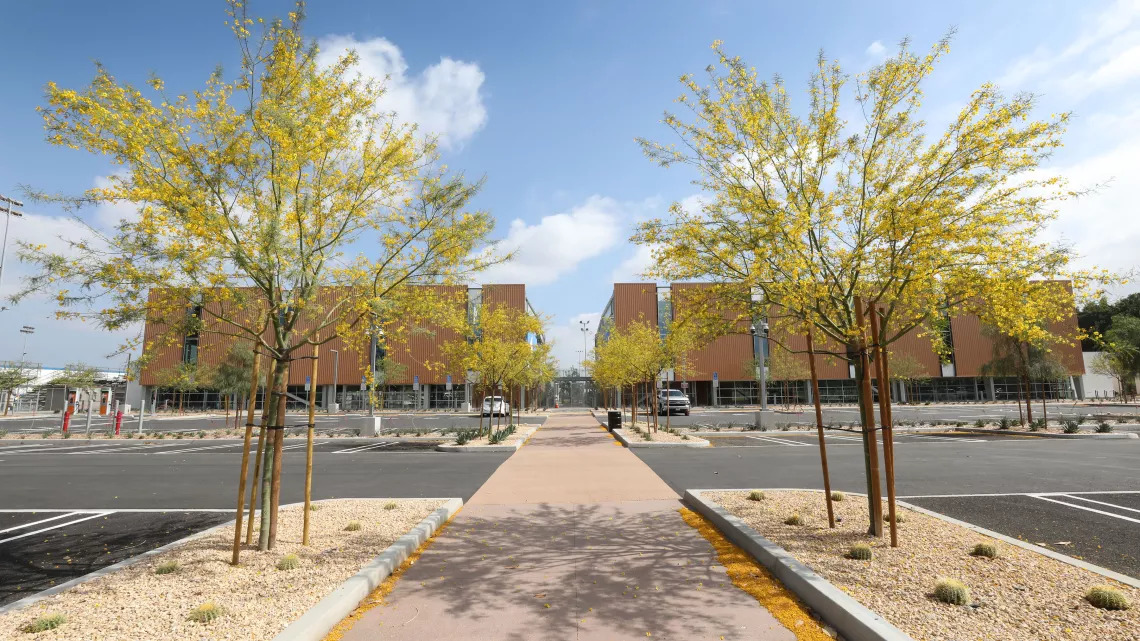
- Exterior view of the complex in 2022
- Interactive map of Obama Sports Complex
- Full name: Michelle and Barack Obama Sports Complex
- Former names: Rancho Cienega Recreation Center (1937–2022)
- Address: 5001 Obama Boulevard; Baldwin Hills, LA; U.S.
- Owner: City of Los Angeles Department of Recreation and Parks
- Type: Sports complex
- Public transit: Farmdale; Expo/La Brea

Construction
- Built: 1936-37
- Opened: 1937; 89 years ago
- Architect: SPF Architects (Note: SPF: abbreviation from "Studio Pali Fekete".) (renovation)

Website
- recreation.parks.lacity.gov/sports-complex

The Michelle and Barack Obama Sports Complex, previously known as the Rancho Cienega Recreation Center, is a multibuilding sports complex in Baldwin Hills, Los Angeles. The complex is owned and operated by the city of Los Angeles Department of Recreation and Parks.

The complex is named after former U.S. First Lady Michelle Obama and her husband, former U.S. president Barack Obama. Barack Obama held a rally at the center in 2007. The complex neighbors Susan Miller Dorsey High School, who is partnered with it for its use in school events.

== History ==
In 1936, plans for what would become the Rancho Cienega Playground was laid out, with construction beginning that same year. In 1937, the newly opened Susan Miller Dorsey High School partnered with the center to host its sporting events. Sports coach Benny Lefebvre served as a playground supervisor for the park in the 1930s. In 1998, the pool at the center was renamed to the Celes King III Swimming Pool, honoring the businessman.

In 2007 presidential candidate Barack Obama held a rally at the Rancho Cienega Recreation Center in the beginning of his campaign. In 2013, the Los Angeles Dodgers alongside the LA84 Foundation dedicated a Dodgers Dreamfield in the center, with the field being the 30th Dreamfield they had unveiled.

=== Renovation and renaming ===
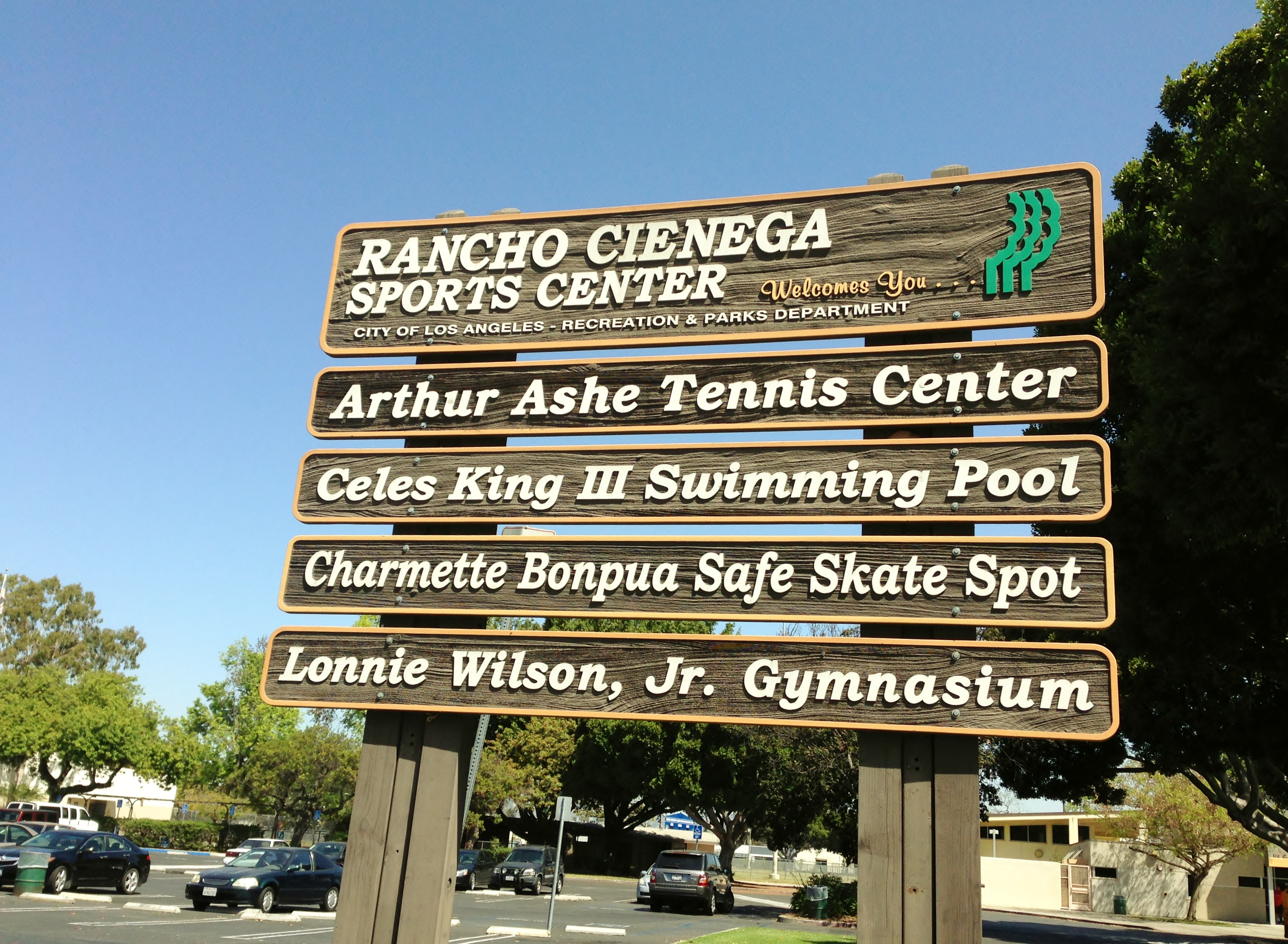
Park signage with the complex's previous name "Rancho Cienega", 2014

In 2015 Studio Pali Fekete Architects were selected by the City of Los Angeles to expand and redevelop the Rancho Cienega Sports Complex, which would be renamed the Michelle and Barack Obama Sports Complex in honor of Michelle and Barack Obama. The project would be designed to meet LEED silver certification and have a net zero energy use. In April 2021, it was reported that the project was 95% complete and would be finished during the summer.

On June 29, 2022, the new "Michelle and Barack Obama Sports Complex" was inaugurated. It included over 24 acres with an indoor gym and two high school basketball courts as well as a mezzanine walking track and a new Olympic-size pool.

The court was renovated as a part of the city and the Los Angeles Clippers's efforts to renovate all 350 courts in Los Angeles. On July 7, 2022, the complex opened to the public.

== Facilities ==
The facilities include a 23,000 m2 swimming pool facility, a 16,000 m2 basketball court, a raised walking track, a tennis center and court, and an enclosed garden. The facilities are pre-engineered manufactured buildings so it would be cost-effective.

== Sports and activities ==
The complex's facilities host the practise of many sports such as baseball, boxing, basketball, dodgeball, flag football, futsal, golf, gymnastics, handball, lacrosse, martial arts, softball, tennis, track and field, and volleyball, plus other recreational activities such as cheer, and dance.
