= Steve Rodriguez =

American baseball player and coach (born 1970)

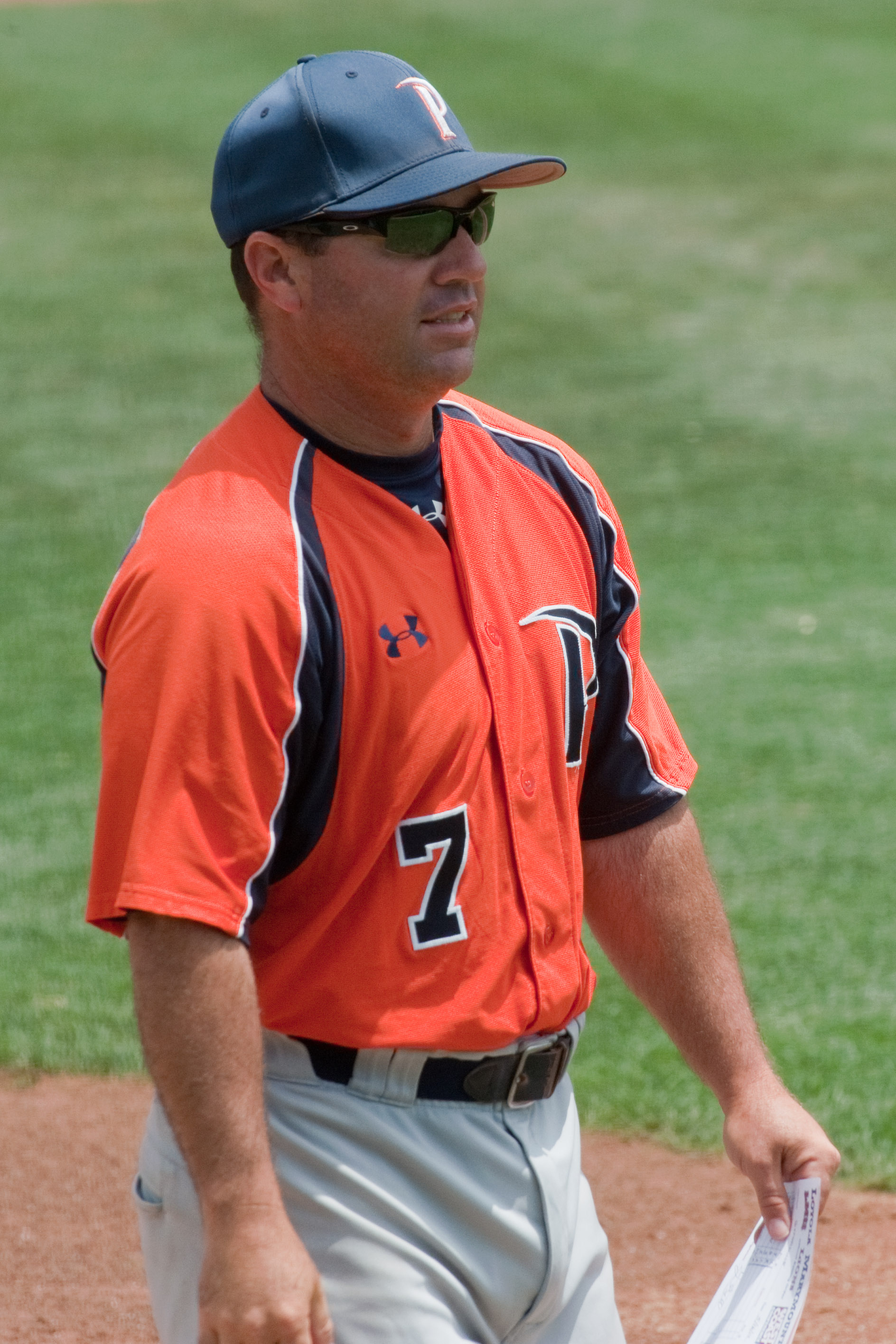
- Rodriguez with Pepperdine in 2010
- Second baseman/Shortstop/Coach
- Born: November 29, 1970 (age 55); Las Vegas, Nevada, U.S.
- Batted: Right Threw: Right

MLB debut
- April 30, 1995, for the Boston Red Sox

Last MLB appearance
- October 1, 1995, for the Detroit Tigers

MLB statistics
- Batting average: .179
- Runs scored: 5
- Stolen bases: 2
- Stats at Baseball Reference

Teams
- Player: Boston Red Sox (1995); Detroit Tigers (1995); Coach: Pepperdine Waves (2004–2015); Baylor Bears (2016–2022)

Steven James Rodríguez (born November 29, 1970) is an American baseball coach and former second baseman/shortstop. He played college baseball for the Pepperdine Waves from 1991 to 1992. He played in Major League Baseball (MLB) during the 1995 season. He served as the head coach of the Pepperdine Waves (2004–2015) and the Baylor Bears (2016–2022).

A native of Las Vegas, Nevada, he was selected by Boston in the fifth-round of the 1992 draft out of Pepperdine. He would play briefly for the Boston Red Sox and Detroit Tigers during the 1995 season. Rodríguez was hired as the 19th head coach of the Baylor University baseball team on June 12, 2015. In 2022 Rodriguez joined Texas as a hitting coach until 2024.

== Playing career ==
=== High school ===
Rodriguez attended Valley High School in Winchester, Nevada. Prior to being recruited by the Pepperdine Waves baseball team, he had never heard of Pepperdine University and did not know where Malibu was. Nonetheless, he was won over by handwritten letters from coach Andy Lopez.

=== College ===
A two-time All-American (1991–92), Rodríguez helped his team claim its only national championship in the 1992 College World Series, when he was named West Coast Conference Player of the Year and also was a member of the All-Tournament Team. Rodríguez collected a .419 batting average –the third-highest single-season average in school history– and his 104 base hits that season are also a Pepperdine single-season record, as he finished with a .382 average in the round-robin phase of the 1991 Pan American Games for the Bronze Medal USA baseball team, earning Player of the Series honors against Mexico and Cuba. Then, in 1992, Rodríguez was named one of the West Coast Conference's Top Fifty Athletes of all time.

=== Major League Baseball ===
In an 18-game major league career, Rodríguez was a .179 hitter (7-for-39) with five runs, two doubles, and two stolen bases without home runs or an RBI. He also played in the Red Sox, Tigers, Los Angeles Dodgers and Montreal Expos minor league systems from 1992 to 1998, hitting .263 with 16 home runs and 205 RBI in 613 games.

== Coaching career ==
Following his playing career, Rodríguez served as an assistant coach at his alma mater from 2000 to 2003, and was the head coach from 2004 to 2015. He was hired as the sixteenth head coach in the history of the Pepperdine baseball program in June 2003, to become only the third former Pepperdine player head coach for the Waves in the program's sixty-five-year history.

Taking over a young team in 2004, Rodríguez guided Pepperdine to the WCC Championship where the Waves swept conference rival Loyola Marymount University in the best-of-three WCC championship series.

In 2015, Rodriguez was hired to be the head coach at Baylor.

On July 7, 2022, Rodriguez joined the staff of the Texas Longhorns as the team's hitting coach.

=== Head coaching records ===
Below is a table of Rodriguez's yearly records as an NCAA head baseball coach.

Record table
Season	Team	Overall	Conference	Standing	Postseason
Pepperdine Waves (West Coast Conference) (2004–2015)
2004	Pepperdine	30–32	19–11	1st (West)	NCAA Regional
2005	Pepperdine	41–23	21–9	1st (West)	NCAA Regional
2006	Pepperdine	42–21	15–6	t–1st	NCAA Regional
2007	Pepperdine	35–22	14–7	3rd	NCAA Regional
2008	Pepperdine	38–21	14–6	2nd	NCAA Regional
2009	Pepperdine	31–23	12–9	t–3rd	
2010	Pepperdine	24–30	12–9	3rd	
2011	Pepperdine	22–34	7–14	7th	
2012	Pepperdine	36–23	16–8	1st	NCAA Regional
2013	Pepperdine	27–24	13–11	5th	
2014	Pepperdine	43–18	18–9	1st	NCAA Super Regional
2015	Pepperdine	32–29	17–10	2nd	NCAA Regional
Pepperdine:		401–300	178–109		
Baylor Bears (Big 12 Conference) (2016–2022)
2016	Baylor	24–29	10–14	6th	
2017	Baylor	34–23	12–12	4th	NCAA Regional
2018	Baylor	37–21	13–11	4th	NCAA Regional
2019	Baylor	35–19	14–8	2nd	NCAA Regional
2020	Baylor	10–6	0–0		Season canceled due to COVID-19
2021	Baylor	31–20	11–13	6th	
2022	Baylor	26–28	7–17	8th	
Baylor:		197–136 (.592)	67–75 (.472)		
Total:		598–436 (.578)			
National champion Postseason invitational champion Conference regular season champion Conference regular season and conference tournament champion Division regular season champion Division regular season and conference tournament champion Conference tournament champion

== See also ==
- 1991 College Baseball All-America Team
