= A. J. Puckett =

American baseball player (born 1995)

Charros de Jalisco – No. 16
- Pitcher
- Born: May 27, 1995 (age 30); Walnut Creek, California, U.S.
- Bats: Right Throws: Right
- Stats at Baseball Reference

Austin Joseph Puckett (born May 27, 1995) is an American professional baseball pitcher for the Charros de Jalisco of the Mexican League. Prior to pitching professionally, Puckett played college baseball for the Pepperdine Waves of Pepperdine University.

== Career ==
=== Amateur career ===
Puckett attended De La Salle High School in Concord, California. He played baseball and American football for De La Salle, pitching for the baseball team and playing quarterback and safety in football. The Oakland Athletics selected Puckett in the 35th round of the 2013 MLB draft, but he did not sign with Oakland. Puckett then enrolled at Pepperdine University and played college baseball for the Pepperdine Waves. In 2015, he played collegiate summer baseball with the Chatham Anglers of the Cape Cod Baseball League. In 2016, his junior year, Puckett pitched 45 2/3 innings without allowing a run, the third-longest scoreless streak in NCAA Division I history. He finished his junior year with a 9–3 win–loss record, a 1.27 ERA, and 95 strikeouts to 26 walks in 99 1/3 innings. Puckett was named a First Team All-American by the American Baseball Coaches Association, Baseball America, and Collegiate Baseball Newspaper. He was named a Second Team All-American by the National Collegiate Baseball Writers Association.

=== Kansas City Royals ===
The Kansas City Royals selected Puckett in the second round, with the 67th overall selection, of the 2016 MLB draft. He signed with the Royals, receiving a $1.2 signing bonus. After signing, he was assigned to the AZL Royals, and after pitching to a 3.86 ERA in two games, he was promoted to the Lexington Legends where he posted a 2–3 record and 3.66 ERA in 11 games. He began the 2017 season with the Wilmington Blue Rocks.

=== Chicago White Sox ===
The Royals traded Puckett and Andre Davis to the Chicago White Sox for Melky Cabrera on July 30, 2017. The White Sox assigned him to the Winston-Salem Dash. In 25 total games started between Wilmington and Winston-Salem, Puckett posted a 10–7 record with a 3.98 ERA. He missed the entire 2018 season with elbow pain, and elected to undergo Tommy John surgery on March 13, 2019.

Puckett did not play in a game in 2020 due to the cancellation of the minor league season because of the COVID-19 pandemic.

=== Atlanta Braves ===
On December 10, 2020, the Atlanta Braves selected Puckett in the minor league phase of the Rule 5 draft. Puckett split the 2021 season between the High-A Rome Braves and the Double-A Mississippi Braves, accumulating a 4–6 record and 2.90 ERA with 72 strikeouts in 80 2/3 innings pitched across 20 games.

In 2022, Puckett returned to Mississippi. In 33 games, he struggled to a 2–5 record and 7.36 ERA with 74 strikeouts in 58 2/3 innings of work. Puckett elected free agency following the season on November 10, 2022.

=== Seattle Mariners ===
On February 8, 2023, Puckett signed a minor league contract with the Seattle Mariners organization. In 47 appearances split between the Double–A Arkansas Travelers and Triple–A Tacoma Rainiers, he accumulated a 6–4 record and 4.52 ERA with 54 strikeouts across 63 2/3 innings pitched. Puckett elected free agency following the season on November 6.

=== Charros de Jalisco ===
On April 23, 2024, Puckett signed with the Charros de Jalisco of the Mexican League. In 18 appearances for Jalisco, he compiled a 3–0 record and 1.02 ERA with 17 strikeouts and 3 saves across 17 2/3 innings pitched.

=== Chicago Cubs ===
On January 30, 2025, Puckett signed a minor league contract with the Chicago Cubs. He made 46 appearances out of the bullpen for the Double-A Knoxville Smokies, compiling a 3-6 record and 3.35 ERA with 46 strikeouts and 15 saves across 51 innings pitched. Puckett elected free agency following the season on November 6.

=== Charros de Jalisco (second stint) ===
On February 24, 2026, Puckett signed with the Charros de Jalisco of the Mexican Leagus.

== Personal life ==
Between his sophomore and junior years of high school, Puckett suffered a brain injury. Doctors put him in a medically induced coma for three days.

== See also ==
- Rule 5 draft results
