= Tyler LaTorre =

Baseball player and coach

Current position
- Title: Head coach
- Team: Pepperdine
- Conference: WCC
- Record: 12–42 (.222)

Biographical details
- Born: April 22, 1983 (age 43); Santa Cruz, California, U.S.

Playing career
- 2003–2006: UC Davis
- 2006–2007: Salem-Keizer Volcanoes
- 2006: San Jose Giants
- 2006: Arizona League Giants
- 2008: San Jose Giants
- 2009: Connecticut Defenders
- 2010: Richmond Flying Squirrels
- 2011–2014: Fresno Grizzlies
- 2011–2012: San Jose Giants
- 2013–2014: Richmond Flying Squirrels
- 2015: Biloxi Shuckers
- 2016: Unipol Bologna
- Position: Catcher

Coaching career (HC unless noted)
- 2016–2017: San Francisco State (PC)
- 2018–2019: San Jose State (PC)
- 2020–2022: Sacramento State (PC)
- 2023–2024: Westmont
- 2025–present: Pepperdine

Head coaching record
- Overall: 45–57–3 (.443) (NCAA); 48–9 (.842) (NAIA)

Accomplishments and honors

Championships
- NAIA World Series (2023); GSAC Regular Season (2023); GSAC Conference Tournament (2023)

Tyler James LaTorre (born April 22, 1983) is an American baseball coach and former professional baseball catcher. He is the head baseball coach of the Pepperdine University baseball team. LaTorre played college baseball at University of California, Davis from 2003 to 2006 for coach Rex Peters before going on to a professional career from 2006 to 2016. He played for Team Italy in the 2013 World Baseball Classic.

== Head coaching record ==
Record table
Season	Team	Overall	Conference	Standing	Postseason
Westmont Warriors (Great Southwest Athletic Conference) (2023–2023)
2023	Westmont	48–9	20–4	1st	2023 NAIA National Champion
Westmont:		48–9 (.842)	20–4–0 (.833)		
Westmont Warriors (Pacific West Conference) (2024–2024)
2024	Westmont	33–15–3	23–8–1	2nd	PacWest tournament
Westmont:		33–15–3 (.676)	23–8–1 (.734)		
Pepperdine Waves (West Coast Conference) (2025–present)
2025	Pepperdine	12–42	7–17	T–8th	
2026	Pepperdine	0–0	0–0		
Pepperdine:		12–42 (.222)	7–17 (.292)		
Total:		45–57–3 (.443)			
National champion Postseason invitational champion Conference regular season champion Conference regular season and conference tournament champion Division regular season champion Division regular season and conference tournament champion Conference tournament champion
