= Alumni Park (Pepperdine) =

Park in Malibu, California, United States

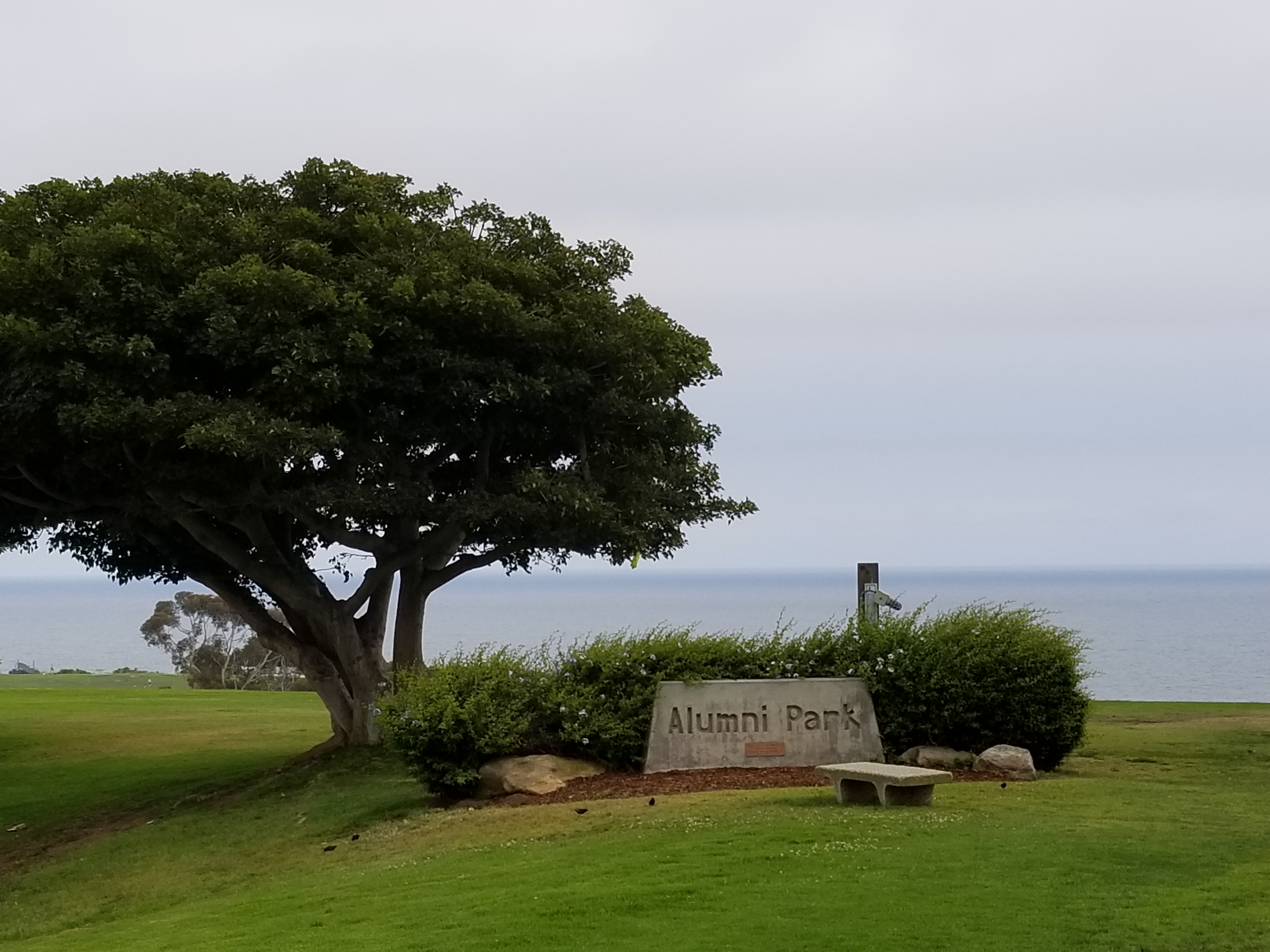
- Interactive map of Alumni Park
- Type: Urban park
- Location: Malibu, California
- Coordinates: 34°02′19.26″N 118°42′27.29″W
- Area: 30 acres (0.12 km^{2})
- Owner: Pepperdine University
- Operator: Pepperdine University

Alumni Park, is a private park owned by Pepperdine University in Malibu, California. The park is a 30 acre expanse of trails, lawns, hills, ponds and coral trees. The 40,000 square feet ponds are considered open reservoirs of reclaimed water. The park hosts an annual Waves of Flags display. Nearly 3,000 flags are displayed each September to commemorate each of the lives lost in the September 11 attacks.

Alumni Park is the home course for the Pepperdine Waves men's and women's cross country teams. It hosted the 2013 West Coast Conference cross country championship.

The park is used for university graduation ceremonies, and is also used for music events.

== Gallery ==
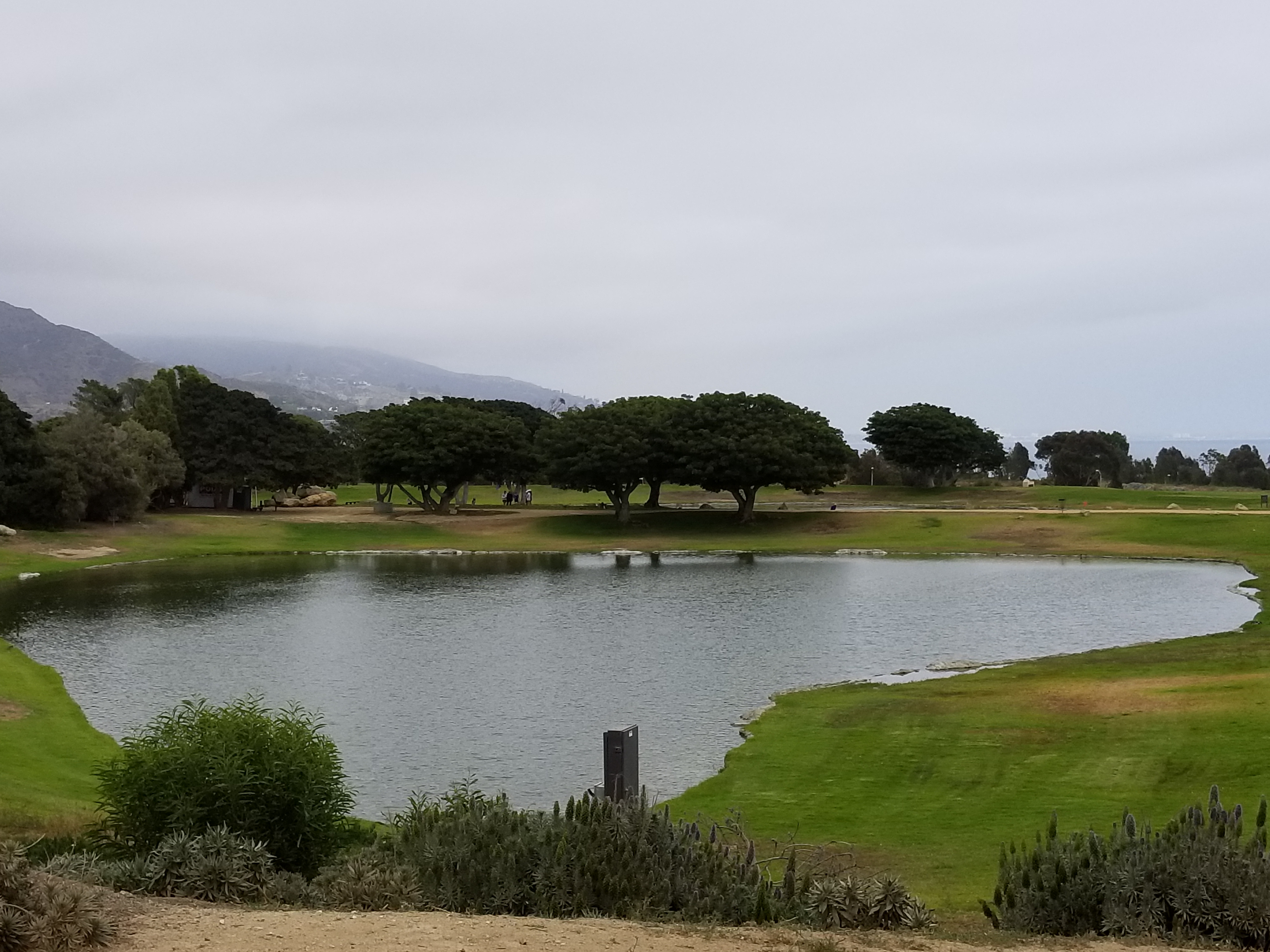
Alumni Park

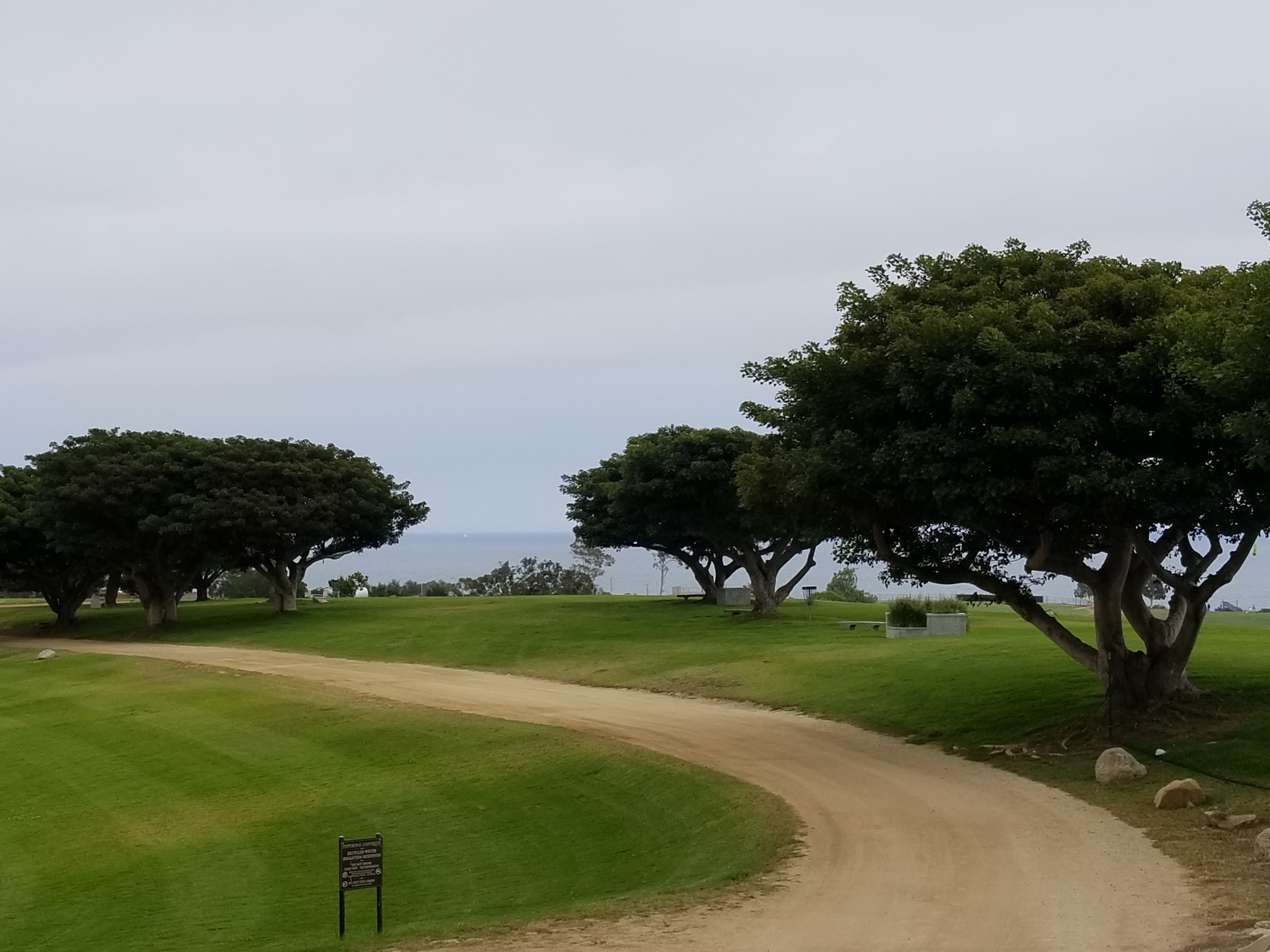
Alumni Park trail

== See also ==
- Pepperdine University
- Pepperdine Waves
