= Benny Lefebvre =

American athlete and sports coach (1912–1994)

- Lefebvre at St. Bernard High School, c. 1977

Biographical details
- Born: November 16, 1912; Douglas, Arizona, U.S.
- Died: April 2, 1994 (aged 81)
- Education: Pepperdine University

Playing career

Football
- 1934: Long Beach Longshoremen
- 1935: Los Angeles Maroons
- 1936: Hollywood Stars
- 1937: Los Angeles Spoilers
- 1937: Hollywood All-Stars
- 1940–1941, 1947, 1949: Los Angeles Spoilers

Rugby
- 1940: Los Angeles Spoilers
- Positions: Quarterback, halfback, safety

Coaching career (HC unless noted)

Baseball
- 1940–1941: Pepperdine
- c. 1947–1951: Crenshaw Post American Legion
- 1956: Pius X HS
- 1957: Villanova Preparatory
- 1957–1959: St. John Vianney HS
- 1960–1961: Morningside HS
- 1962: Pepperdine
- ?–1975: Murphy HS
- 1976–1985: St. Bernard HS

Football
- 1941, 1946–1947, 1949: Los Angeles Spoilers
- 1946: Southern California Military Academy
- 1955: Pius X HS
- 1956: Villanova Preparatory
- 1957–1959: St. John Vianney HS

Accomplishments and honors

Awards
- American Legion League MVP (1935)

Benny M. Lefebvre (lə-FEE-vər; November 16, 1912 – April 2, 1994) was an American athlete and sports coach. After graduating from Manual Arts High School, Lefebvre had a long career in professional football that spanned from 1934 to 1949. He also served as head baseball coach at Pepperdine University from 1940 to 1941, and in 1962. He later coached several high school baseball and football teams until his retirement in 1985. His four brothers each played football, and his three sons each signed professional baseball contracts.

== Early life and education ==
Lefebvre was born on November 16, 1912, in Douglas, Arizona. He attended Manual Arts High School, where he played football and baseball, and graduated in 1931. He attended Pepperdine University from 1937 to 1941.

== Professional career ==
Shortly after graduating from high school, Lefebvre started a professional football career. In 1934, he played for the Long Beach Longshoremen along with his brother Gil, and played at left halfback. In a 28–0 win against the Western Eagles, he scored a safety by tackling Paul Neva as the latter attempted to run on a fake punt. He also scored a touchdown in a 45–0 win over the Riverside Athletic Club.

In October 1935, Lefebvre was signed by the Los Angeles Maroons. Standing five feet, six inches, and weighing just 150 pounds, he was the smallest player on the team and was dubbed their "mighty mite." On October 20, Benny started at halfback for the Maroons, and faced off against his brother Gil, who was the starter in the same position for the Hollywood Braves. Before 10,000 spectators at Gilmore Stadium, the Maroons won by six points in a 13–7 victory. A ten-yard run by Lefebvre to the Braves' one-yard line set up the game-winning score by Jim Keefer. The News-Pilot reported that he "played a starring role" in the game which "was replete with spectacular passing maneuvers" and was "a thrilling pro football" match. Newspapers reported that he "weighs but 150 pounds but has proved to be one of the hardest men to stop in the uptown pro games."

The Los Angeles Times reported that Lefebvre "is one of the shiftiest open-field runners in the professional league and is the player most feared by Coach Dick Mulhaupt's [Westwood] Cubs. Lefebvre is a touchdown threat every time he lugs the ball." Against the Cubs on Thanksgiving Day, the Maroons won 13–7 on a touchdown by Lefebvre. The Times wrote that on the game-winning score, Lefebvre "broke over left tackle on a spinner," and after being "cornered behind the line of scrimmage ... twisted, squirmed and ducked out of the grasps of no less than four Cub tacklers, broke into the open and dashed to the touchdown."

The following game was a rematch with the Hollywood Braves, who featured his brother Gil at starting left halfback. The Maroons lost 14–21 after blowing an early lead, allowing the Braves to score 15 points in the final quarter. Lefebvre helped the team eventually reach the league championship, where they lost 6–10 against the Westwood Cubs in an upset. On January 19, 1936, Lefebvre was voted the league's most valuable player.

In 1936, Lefebvre played for the independent Hollywood Stars, coached by Clark DeGroot. Late in the season, he and his brother were part of Erny Pinckert's All-Stars, who lost 20–51 in an exhibition game against the Chicago Bears. He was described as one of the stars of the game.

Lefebvre was signed by the Los Angeles Spoilers in 1937. He also operated a six-man football team called Lefebvre's All-Stars. Later in the season, he signed with the independent Hollywood All-Stars.

In 1940, Lefebvre briefly played at the three-quarters position in rugby union for the Los Angeles Spoilers (also known as the Spoilers Athletic Club). He also played for the Spoilers A. C. football team. He was described as a "touchdown threat every time he touches the oval [football]."

Lefebvre played again for the Spoilers football team in 1941, and was described as a triple-threat player by the Southwest Topics-Wave. He also served as the team's head coach. His younger brother Everett was on the Spoiler roster. He threw the game-winning touchdown in a 6–0 win over the Valley All-Stars.

After not playing from 1942 to 1946, Lefebvre returned to the Spoiler football team in 1947 as a player-manager. He had previously served as head coach of the Spoilers in 1946. He spent a final season as Spoiler's player-manager in 1949 before retiring. Despite being 36, he was still described as "get[ting] around plenty fast enough," although it was noted that Lefebvre was "slowing down."

== Coaching career ==
Lefebvre joined Pepperdine University as a student in 1937, and became the school's head baseball coach in 1940. He coached the team for two seasons before leaving after his graduation in 1941.

In 1946, Lefebvre served as coach of the Spoilers Athletic Club, as well as the football team at Southern California Military Academy. He became the coach of the Crenshaw Post American Legion baseball team in c. 1947, and competing with over 16,000 other teams, led them to the national championship in 1951. He also served as playground supervisor at Rancho Cienega Playground in Los Angeles.

In 1955, Lefebvre was named head football coach at Pius X High School in Downey, California. He also served as the baseball coach. In August 1956, he transferred to Villanova Preparatory School in Ojai. He became a coach at St. John Vianney High School the following year. He returned to the school for the 1958 season, coaching his three sons who attended the school in football and baseball. In 1960, he left for a position at Morningside High School with his sons, because they "were not getting good baseball competition."

In 1962, Lefebvre was named head baseball coach at Pepperdine University, where he had previously served in that position from 1940 to 1941. After one season, it was announced that he would not return for another year.

Lefebvre later served as baseball coach at Murphy High School, before leaving for St. Bernard High School in 1976. He was named Bay Area Coach of the Year after bringing St. Bernard, who had won just two games the prior year, to a record of 22–3 in his first season. Lefebvre led them to a 16–6 record in his second season. He continued as the school's coach until retiring at the age of 72 in 1985.

== Personal life and death ==
Lefebvre's three sons each signed professional baseball contracts, and all four of his brothers played football.

For several years, Lefebvre operated a summer sports camp on Catalina Island. In 1971, The Los Angeles Times reported that he "is reputed to have more alumni playing major league baseball than any other sports camp director."

Lefebvre died on April 2, 1994, at the age of 81.
