= Chad Tracy (baseball manager) =

American baseball manager (born 1985)

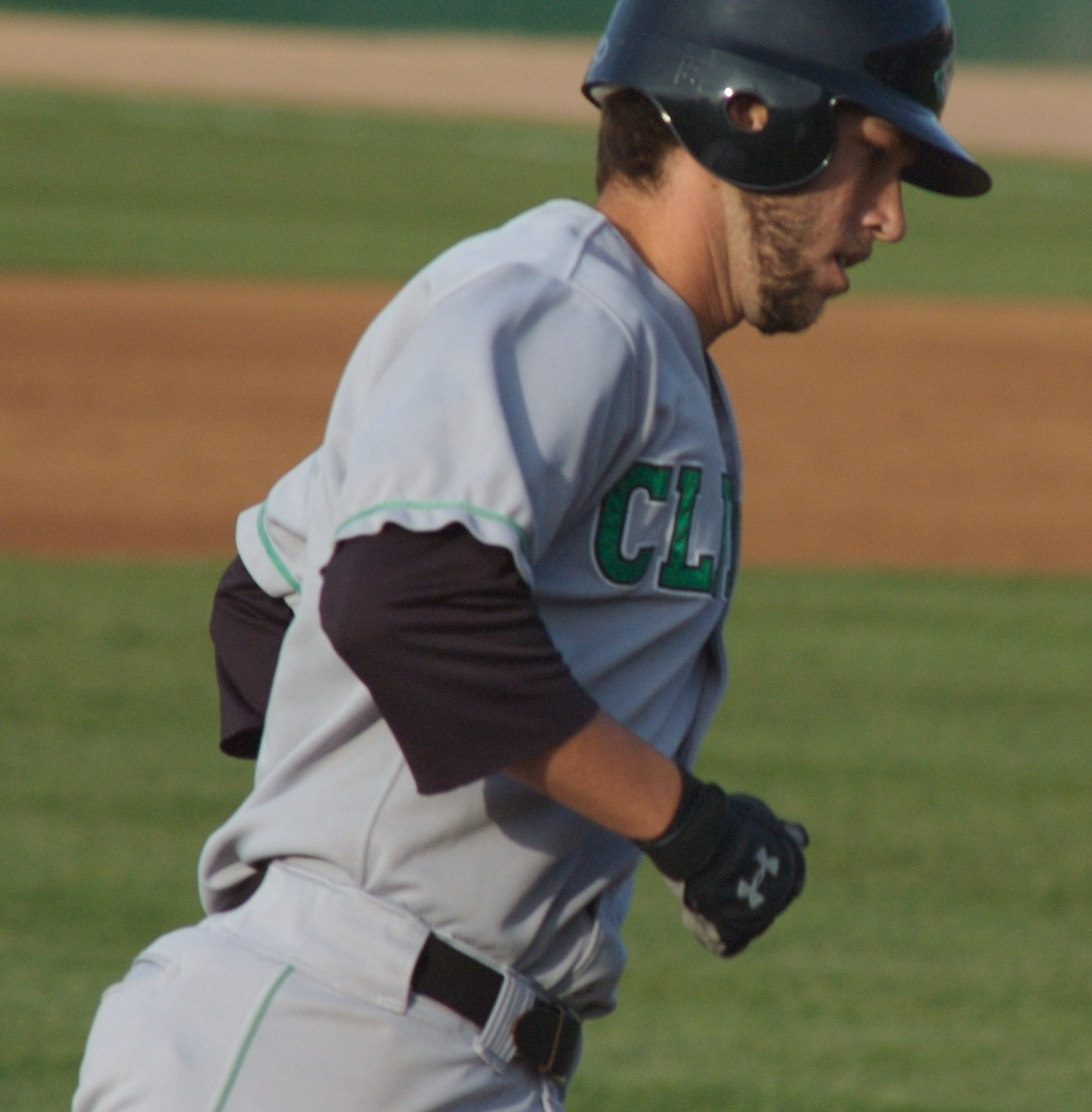
- Tracy with the Clinton LumberKings in 2007

Boston Red Sox – No. 17
- Manager
- Born: July 4, 1985 (age 41); Arlington Heights, Illinois, U.S.
- Bats: Right Throws: Right

Career statistics (through 2026 season)
- Managerial record: 77–58
- Winning %: .570
- Stats at Baseball Reference
- Managerial record at Baseball Reference

Teams
- As manager: Boston Red Sox (2026–present)
Medals
Men's baseball
Representing United States
Pan American Games
Silver medal – second place	2011 Guadalajara	National team

Chad Samuel Tracy (born July 4, 1985) is an American professional baseball manager for the Boston Red Sox of Major League Baseball (MLB). He played college baseball at Pepperdine University then played professionally in Minor League Baseball from 2006 to 2014, primarily as a first baseman. He also competed for the United States national baseball team.

== Amateur career ==
Tracy attended Claremont High School in Claremont, California, then Pepperdine University, where he played college baseball for the Pepperdine Waves in the West Coast Conference (WCC). At Pepperdine, Tracy was named the WCC All-Star catcher and Player of the Year in 2005, as he led the WCC with a .367 batting average, 94 hits, 12 home runs, 61 runs batted in (RBIs), and 22 doubles. He was named a preseason All-American and a semifinalist for the Johnny Bench Award, given to the top NCAA Division I catcher, in 2006.

== Professional career ==
Overall, Tracy played eight seasons with affiliated Minor League Baseball teams, appearing in 857 games while batting .265 with 127 home runs and 572 RBIs. He also played 233 games with other professional teams (fall, winter, or independent leagues), batting .264 with 42 home runs and 161 RBIs. Defensively, he played primarily as a first baseman, appearing at that position in 499 total games while compiling a .986 fielding percentage.

=== Texas Rangers organization (2006–2011) ===
The Texas Rangers selected Tracy in the third round, with the 88th overall selection, of the 2006 Major League Baseball draft. He made his professional debut with the Spokane Indians of the Low–A Northwest League that season, and was named a Northwest League postseason all-star.

In 2007, Tracy played for the Clinton LumberKings of the Single–A Midwest League, batting .250 with 14 home runs and 84 RBI in 134 games; defensively, he was primarily a left fielder. He was named a mid-season all-star. He also played 26 games in the Hawaii Winter Baseball league. In 2008, he played for the Bakersfield Blaze of the High–A California League and the Frisco RoughRiders of the Double-A Texas League, batting a combined .296 with 17 home runs and 82 RBI in 130 games, while seeing time as a left fielder, first baseman, and catcher. He also played 15 games in the Arizona Fall League.

Tracy returned to Double-A Frisco in 2009, playing 136 games while batting .279 with 26 home runs and 107 RBI; defensively, he played 81 games as a first baseman. He was also named a Texas League postseason all-star. In 2010, Tracy played in Triple-A with the Oklahoma City RedHawks, batting .263 with 17 home runs and 55 RBI in 78 games. He also played one game with the rookie-league Arizona League Rangers.

The Rangers invited Tracy to spring training as a non-roster invitee in 2011. He spent the season in Triple-A, batting .259 with 26 home runs and 109 RBI in 134 games for the Round Rock Express of the Pacific Coast League (PCL).

=== Other organizations (2012–2014) ===
The Colorado Rockies acquired Tracy from the Rangers before the 2012 season, via a trade for pitcher Greg Reynolds, and invited him to spring training. He spent the season with the Colorado Springs Sky Sox of the PCL, playing in 133 games while batting .259 with 12 home runs and 82 RBI. After the season, Tracy elected to become a free agent.

Tracy signed a minor-league contract with the Kansas City Royals prior to the 2013 season. In 45 games with the Omaha Royals of the PCL, he batted .187 with 4 home runs and 18 RBI. He was released on July 3. He then played 59 games with the York Revolution of the Atlantic League of Professional Baseball, an independent baseball league, batting .289 with nine home runs and 37 RBI.

In January 2014, Tracy signed a minor-league contract with the Baltimore Orioles, but did not play for their organization. He returned to the Revolution, batting .272 with 23 home runs and 97 RBI during 2014, his final professional season as a player.

=== International competition ===
Tracy played for the United States national baseball team in the 2011 Baseball World Cup and the 2011 Pan American Games, winning a silver medal.

== Managerial career ==
Tracy managed for three seasons in the farm system of the Los Angeles Angels. In 2015, he led the Burlington Bees of the Single-A Midwest League to a 63–76 record. He then spent 2016 and 2017 with the Inland Empire 66ers, a High-A team in the California League, compiling records of 48–92 and 65–75, respectively. He then spent four seasons as the Angels' minor league field coordinator.

On December 13, 2021, Tracy was named the manager of the Worcester Red Sox, the Triple-A affiliate of the Boston Red Sox. He was voted as the best managerial prospect in both 2023 and 2024 by Baseball America.

On April 25, 2026, Tracy was named the interim manager of the Boston Red Sox after the club parted ways with Alex Cora. At the time, the team sat with a 10–17 record, with many fans deeming the season "over". Entering the month of July, the Red Sox had a 37–46 record, out of contention and preparing to trade off pieces leading up to the deadline, but Tracy led them to the best calendar month in franchise history, going 21–4, to improve their record to 58–51, firmly in a playoff spot and in the race for the AL East division crown. The run included a 15-game win streak, tying the franchise record, as well as sweeping the back-to-back champions Los Angeles Dodgers for the first time in 16 years. On September 20, the Red Sox clinched a spot in the playoffs, officially completing the turnaround. On September 22, the Red Sox removed the interim tag from Tracy, signing him to a three-year contract with a fourth year option, to make him the manager of the team. He subsequently lost to the New York Yankees in two games in the AL Wild Card series.

=== Managerial record ===
As of September 30, 2026

Team	Year	Regular season					Postseason			
Team	Year	Games	Won	Lost	Win %	Finish	Won	Lost	Win %	Result
BOS	2026	135	77	58	.570	3rd in AL East	0	2	.000	Lost ALWC (NYY)
Total		135	77	58	.570		0	2	.000	

== Personal life ==
Tracy's father, Jim Tracy, is a former major league player, coach, and manager. His paternal grandfather, Jim Tracy Sr., and two brothers, Brian and Mark, also played baseball professionally.

Tracy has noted that, prior to his manager role with the Red Sox, most of the times he was asked to sign a baseball card, it would actually be a card for the like-named Chad Tracy who played in the major leagues during 2004–2013 as a corner infielder.

Preceded by Billy McMillon	Worcester Red Sox manager 2022–2026	Succeeded by Iggy Suarez (acting)
