= Expo/La Brea station =

Los Angeles Metro Rail station

Expo/La Brea
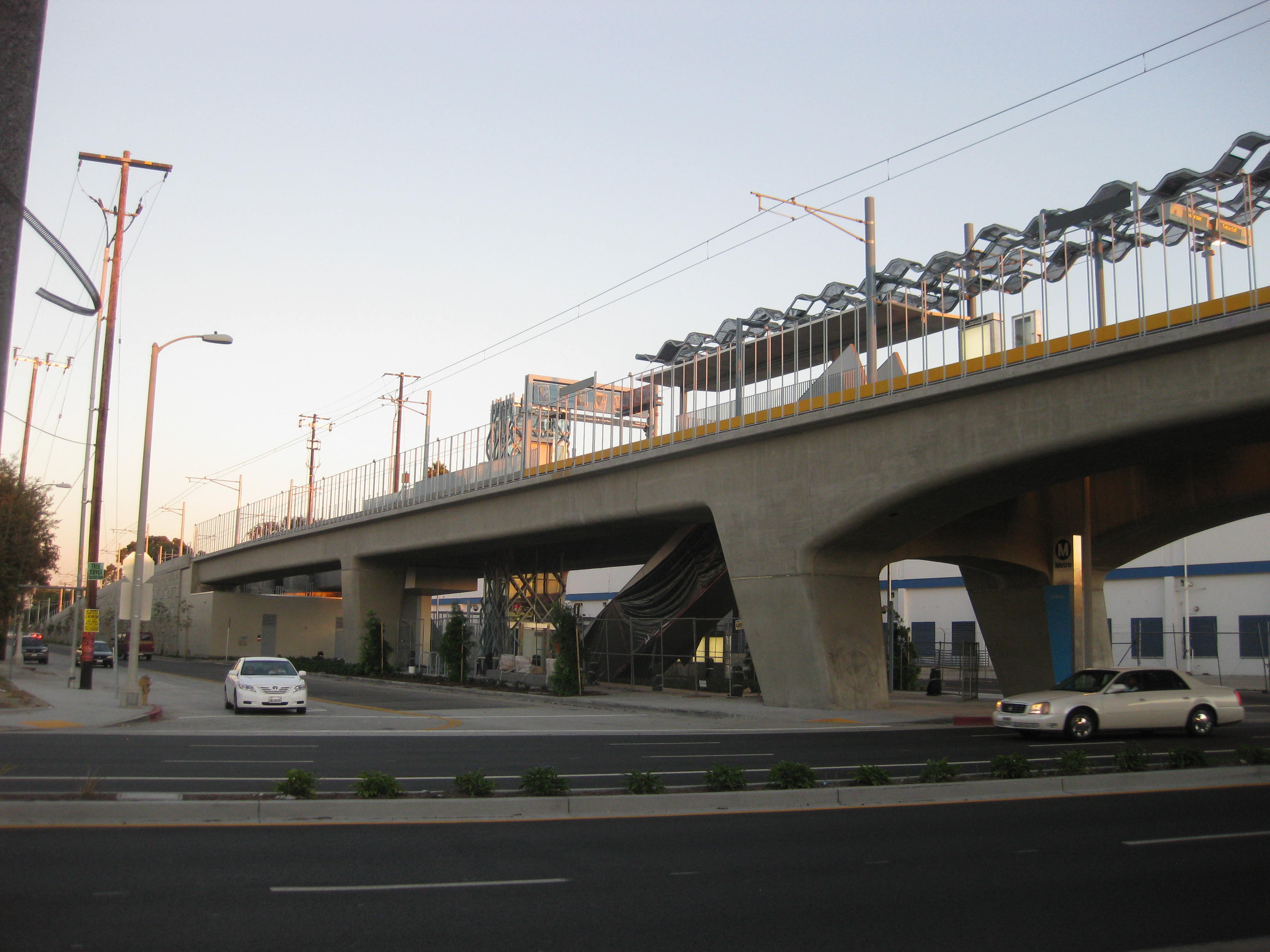
- La Brea/Expo station, under construction in 2011

General information
- Other names: Expo/La Brea/Ethel Bradley
- Location: 5060 West Exposition Boulevard; Los Angeles, California
- Coordinates: 34.0248°N 118.3552°W
- Owner: Metro
- Platforms: 1 island platform
- Tracks: 2
- Connections: LADOT DASH; Los Angeles Metro Bus

Construction
- Structure type: Elevated
- Cycle facilities: Racks and lockers
- Accessible: Yes

History
- Opened: October 17, 1875
- Rebuilt: April 28, 2012
- Former names: Airville

Passengers
- FY 2025: 1,554 (avg. wkdy boardings)

Services
Preceding station	Metro Rail	Following station
La Cienega/Jefferson toward Santa Monica	E Line	Farmdale toward East LA
Former services
Preceding station	Pacific Electric	Following station
Sentous toward Rustic Canyon	Air Line	Cienega toward Pacific Electric Building
Location

Expo/La Brea station is an elevated light rail station on the E Line of the Los Angeles Metro Rail system. The station is located over the intersection of Exposition Boulevard and La Brea Avenue, after which the station is named, in the West Adams neighborhood of Los Angeles.

The official name of the station changed to Expo/La Brea/Ethel Bradley on October 10, 2015, in honor of Ethel Bradley, the wife of former Los Angeles mayor Tom Bradley.

== History ==
Originally a stop on the Los Angeles and Independence and Pacific Electric railroads, it closed on September 30, 1953, with the closure of the Santa Monica Air Line and remained out of service until re-opening on Saturday, April 28, 2012. It was completely rebuilt for the opening of the Expo Line from little more than a station stop marker. Regular scheduled service resumed Monday, April 30, 2012.

== Service ==
=== Hours and frequency ===
E Line service hours are from approximately 4:30 a.m. and 11:45 p.m daily. Trains operate every 8 minutes during peak hours, Monday to Friday. Trains run every 10 minutes, during midday on weekdays and weekends, from 9:00 a.m. to 7:00 p.m. Night and early morning service is approximately every 20 minutes every day.

=== Connections ===
As of December 15, 2024, the following connections are available:

- LADOT DASH: Crenshaw
- Los Angeles Metro Bus: 38, 212

== Notable places nearby ==
The station is within walking distance of the following notable places:

- Michelle and Barack Obama Sports Complex

== Station artwork ==
The station's art was created by artist Jose Lozano. Entitled LA Metro Lotería, the installation depicts scenes related to using LA's Metro system in the style of a Lotería card game.
