= Pepperdine Waves =

Athletic program of Pepperdine University, United States

- University: Pepperdine University
- Nickname: Waves
- NCAA: NCAA Division I
- Conference: West Coast Conference (primary); Mountain Pacific Sports Federation (men's volleyball, women's indoor track & field)
- Athletic director: Tanner Gardner
- Location: Malibu, California, U.S.
- Varsity teams: 17
- Basketball arena: Firestone Fieldhouse
- Baseball stadium: Eddy D. Field Stadium
- Soccer stadium: Tari Frahm Rokus Field
- Volleyball arena: Firestone Fieldhouse
- Other venues: Alumni Park; Raleigh Runnels Memorial Pool; Ralphs-Straus Tennis Center; Zuma Beach
- Colors: Blue, white, and orange
- Mascot: Willie the Wave
- Fight song: "Fight For Pepperdine"
- Website: pepperdinewaves.com

The Pepperdine Waves are the athletics teams of Pepperdine University, located outside the city of Malibu, California. They compete at the Division I level of the NCAA. The school is a member of the West Coast Conference for the majority of its programs. Pepperdine University was recently ranked by the Sears Cup as having the most successful athletic program for non-football Division I schools (Stanford was ranked the most successful Division I athletic program with football). Pepperdine University sponsors seventeen NCAA Division I intercollegiate athletics teams. There are also several intercollegiate sports clubs such as men's soccer, men's and women's lacrosse, surf team, Ultimate Frisbee and men's rugby.

Pepperdine's chief athletic rival is the Loyola Marymount Lions, who are also in the WCC.

== Nickname ==
Since the school's founding, the school's nickname has been the Waves. It was selected by president Batsell Baxter, as the general consensus among faculty and students was that there were too many animal names in college athletics at the time. Though the school was located in South Los Angeles at the time, the name has stuck, becoming more appropriate after the school's move to Malibu.

== Sports sponsored ==
Men's sports	Women's sports
Baseball	Basketball
Basketball	Beach volleyball
Cross country	Cross country
Golf	Golf
Tennis	Soccer
Track and field^{†}	Swimming and diving
Volleyball	Tennis
Water polo	Track and field^{†}
	Volleyball
† – Track and field includes both indoor and outdoor

=== Baseball ===
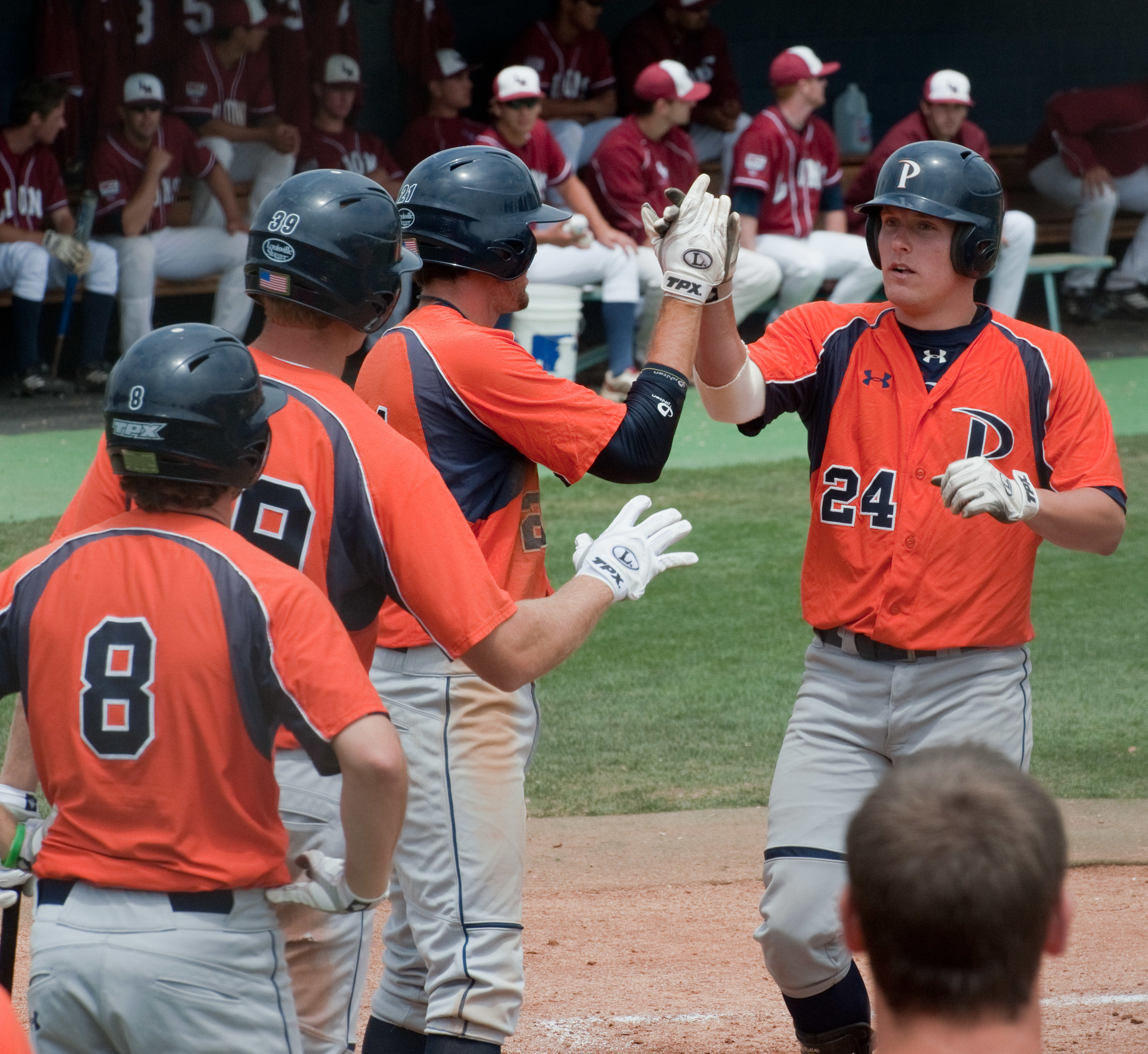
Pepperdine Waves baseball players celebrate a home run during a 2010 game

Major league pitcher Jon Moscot pitched for the baseball team in 2011 and 12. Other Waves pitchers who went on to success in the majors include Dan Haren, Randy Wolf, and Noah Lowry.

=== Basketball ===
Pepperdine sponsors both men's and women's NCAA Division I college basketball teams.

==== Men's ====
The Pepperdine Waves men's basketball team began play in the 1938–1939 season, and has amassed 12 regular-season conference titles and three conference tournament championships. It qualified for the NAIA men's basketball tournament seven times during the 1940s and 1950s. It has made 13 appearances in the NCAA tournament, six in the National Invitation Tournament, and three in the College Basketball Invitational (CBI), and it won the CBI championship in 2021. Thirty-eight former Waves have been drafted or played National Basketball Association as recently as 2021 (Kessler Edwards) and 2023 (Maxwell Lewis).

==== Women's ====
The Pepperdine Waves women's basketball team began play in the 1975–76 season and has won four conference regular-season titles and three conference tournament championships. The Waves have made four appearances in the NCAA tournament and six in the Women's National Invitation Tournament advancing to the Sweet 16 in 2019.

=== Women's beach volleyball ===
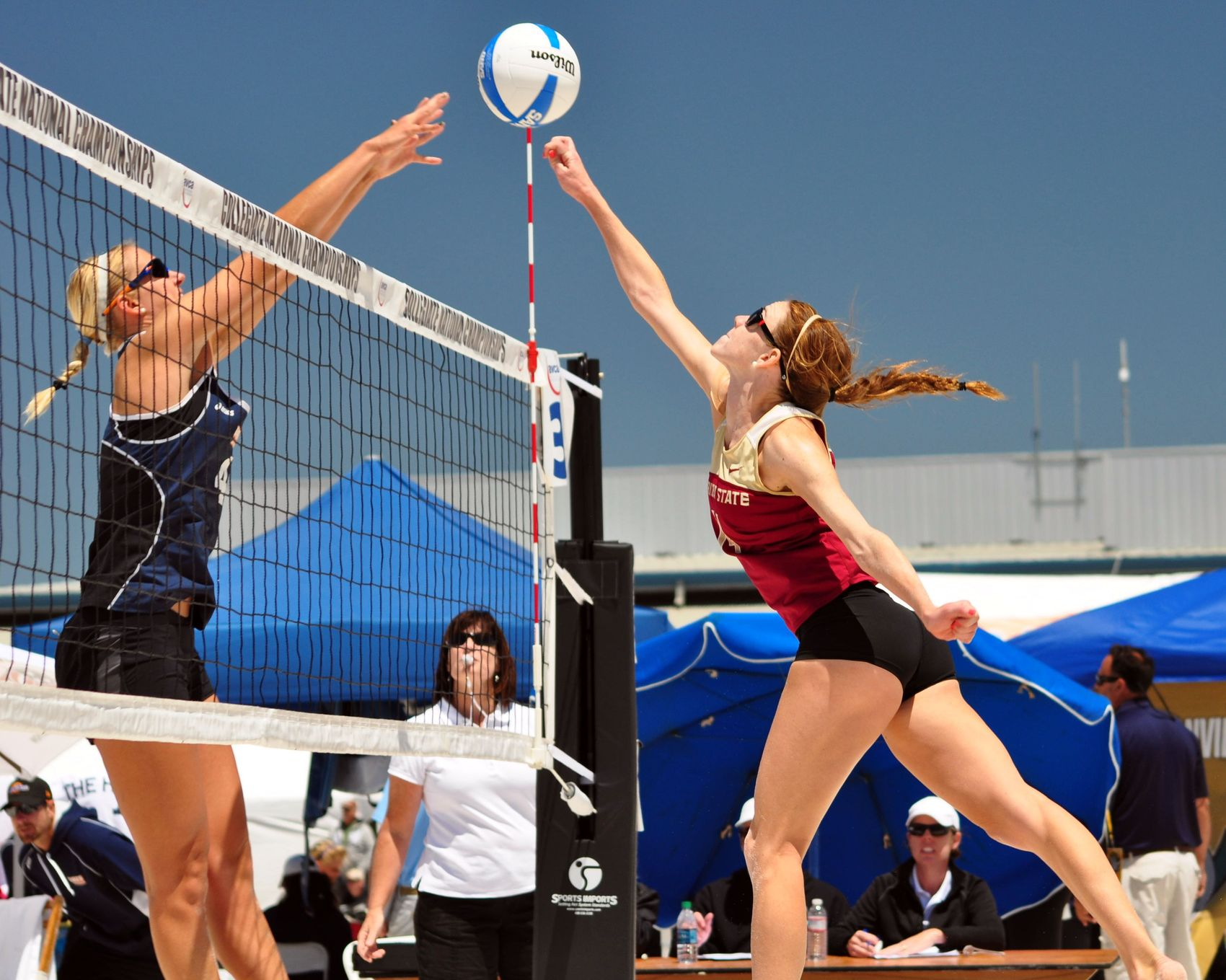
Pepperdine beach volleyball match in 2013

The Pepperdine Waves women's beach volleyball team represents Pepperdine University in women's beach volleyball. Pepperdine launched its beach volleyball program in 2011.

=== Men's golf ===
The men's golf team has won 24 West Coast Conference championships (1987, 1989, 1991, 1992, 1994, 1995, 1996, 1997, 1999, 2000, 2001, 2002, 2003, 2004, 2005, 2007, 2010, 2015, 2018, 2019, 2021, 2022, 2025, 2026) They won the NCAA Division I Championship in 1997 and 2021.

Pepperdine golfers who have won at the professional level are Sahith Theegala (1 PGA Tour win),Brent Geiberger (2 PGA Tour wins), Jason Gore (1 PGA Tour win, 7 Korn Ferry Tour wins), Andrew Putnam (1 PGA Tour win, 2 Korn Ferry Tour wins), Jeff Gove (3 Korn Ferry Tour wins), Michael Putnam (3 Web.com Tour wins), and Byron Smith (1 Korn Ferry Tour win, 4 Canadian Tour wins).

=== Women's soccer ===
The women's soccer team, launched in 1993, has earned an invitation to the NCAA Division I Women's Soccer Championship tournament 12 times, qualified with a national seeding five times, and advanced to the Round of 16 in 2002, 2005, 2014, and 2021. National Women's Soccer League teams have selected seven Pepperdine players in NWSL Drafts: Roxanne Barker (2013, 32nd overall), Michelle Pao (2014, 24th overall), Lynn Williams (2015, 6th overall), Brianna Visalli (2018, 19th overall), Hailey Harbison (2019, 9th overall), Michelle Maemone (2019, 23rd overall), and Joelle Anderson (2021, 26th overall).

=== Men's tennis ===
In 1982 Brad Gilbert transferred to Pepperdine University, playing for Allen Fox. He became an All-American and reached the finals of the 1982 NCAA Championship. Gilbert is a 1999 inductee into the Pepperdine Athletics Hall of Fame.

Andrew Sznajder played college tennis at Pepperdine, where he was a two-time All-American selection (1987 and 1988; he was # 3 in college rankings both years). In 1988, he won the Intercollegiate Tennis Association indoor individual championship. He turned pro in his sophomore year. Israeli tennis player Boaz Merenstein also played for the school.

=== Women's tennis ===
Brazilian Luisa Stefani played for the Waves at the Intercollegiate Tennis tour, ranked as high as No. 2 in the ITA rankings, and was also named the 2015 ITA National Rookie of the Year, having compiled a 40–6 record in her freshman season and reached the semifinals of the 2016 NCAA Singles Championships, where she lost to eventual champion Danielle Collins.

=== Water polo ===
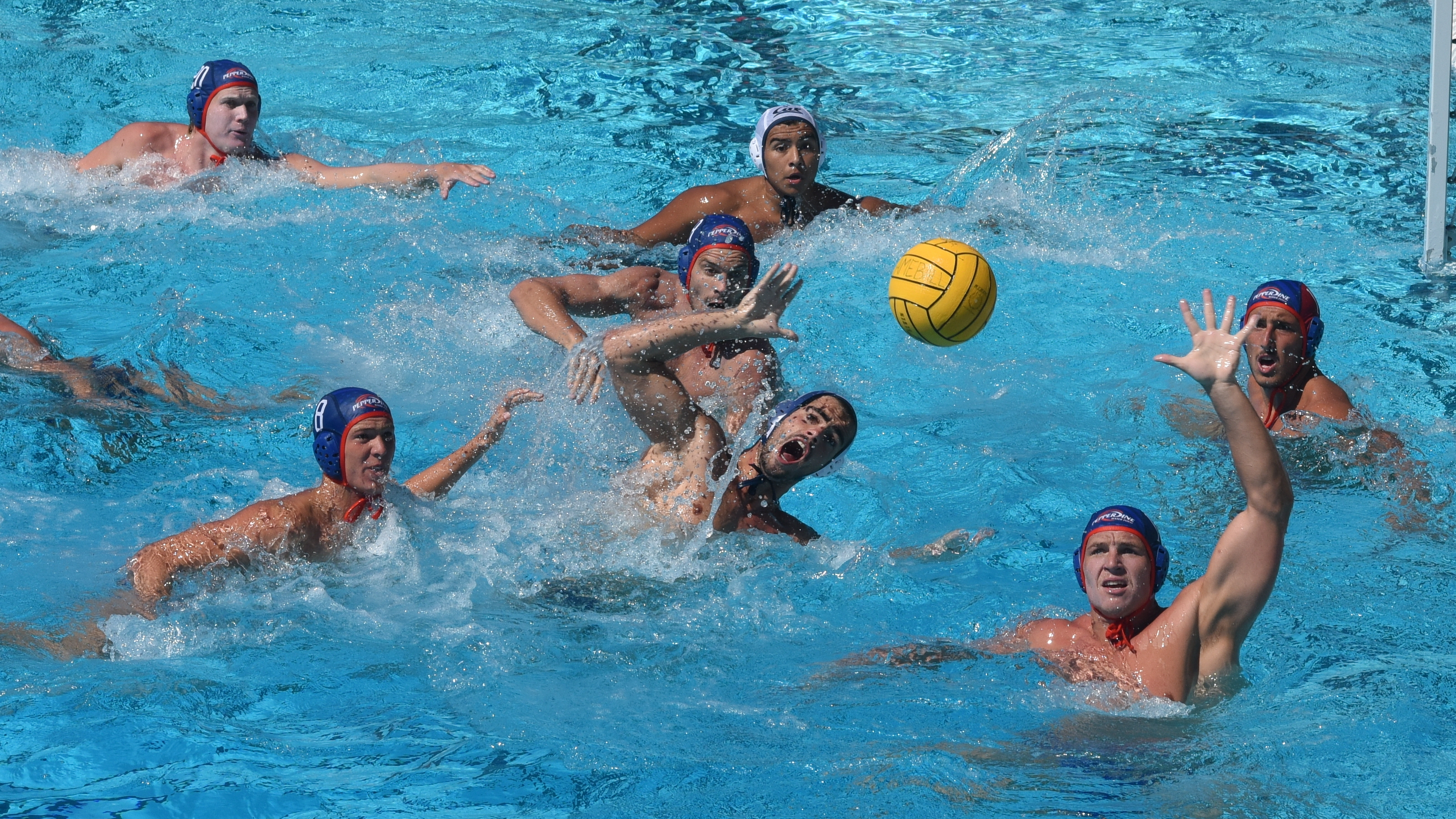
A Waves water polo match in 2018

Merrill Moses, three-time Olympic water polo player and silver medalist, played water polo for the Waves for four years from 1995-98. He was All-American honorable mention in 1996, first team in 1997, and second team in 1998. He was also All-Mountain Pacific Sports Federation all four years, and 1997 MPSF Goalkeeper of the Year. He helped lead Pepperdine to the 1997 NCAA championship, and was game and team MVP. Moses is now Associate Head Coach in water polo at Pepperdine.

== Former sports ==
=== Football ===
Pepperdine played football from 1946 to 1961. At the end of the inaugural 1946 season the Waves defeated Nebraska Wesleyan University in the 1947 Will Rogers Bowl.

== Facilities ==
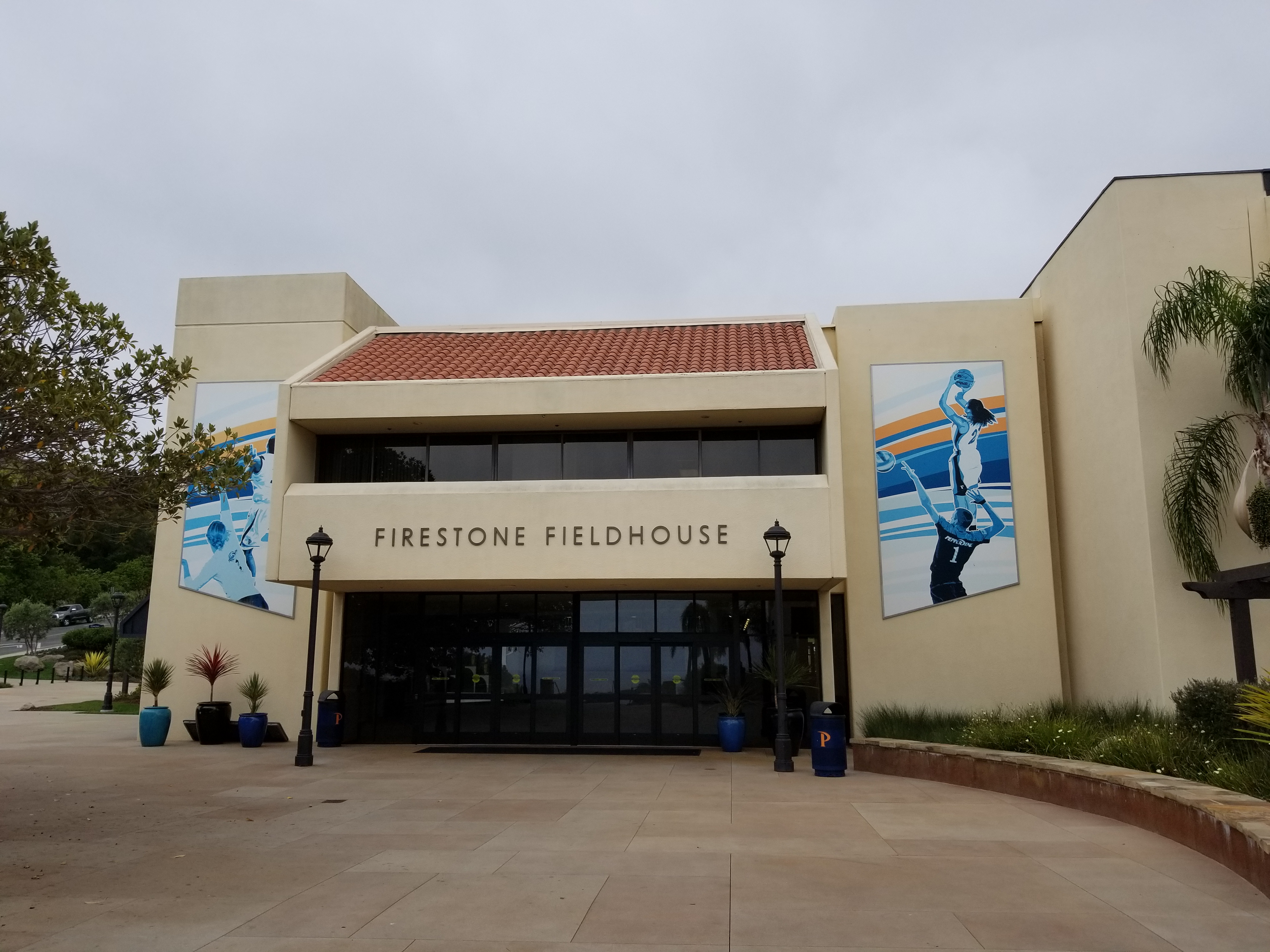
Firestone Fieldhouse

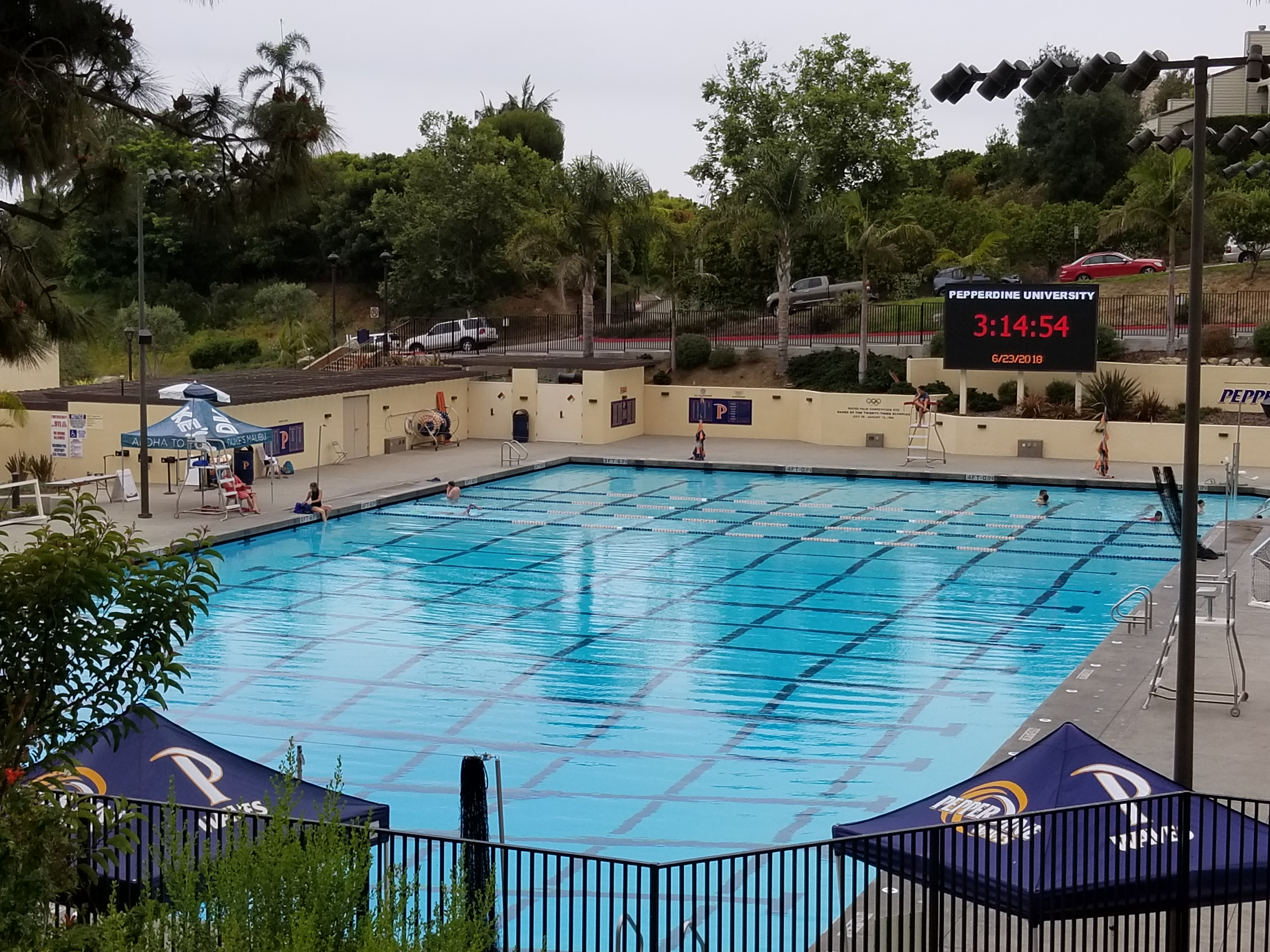
Raleigh Runnels Pool

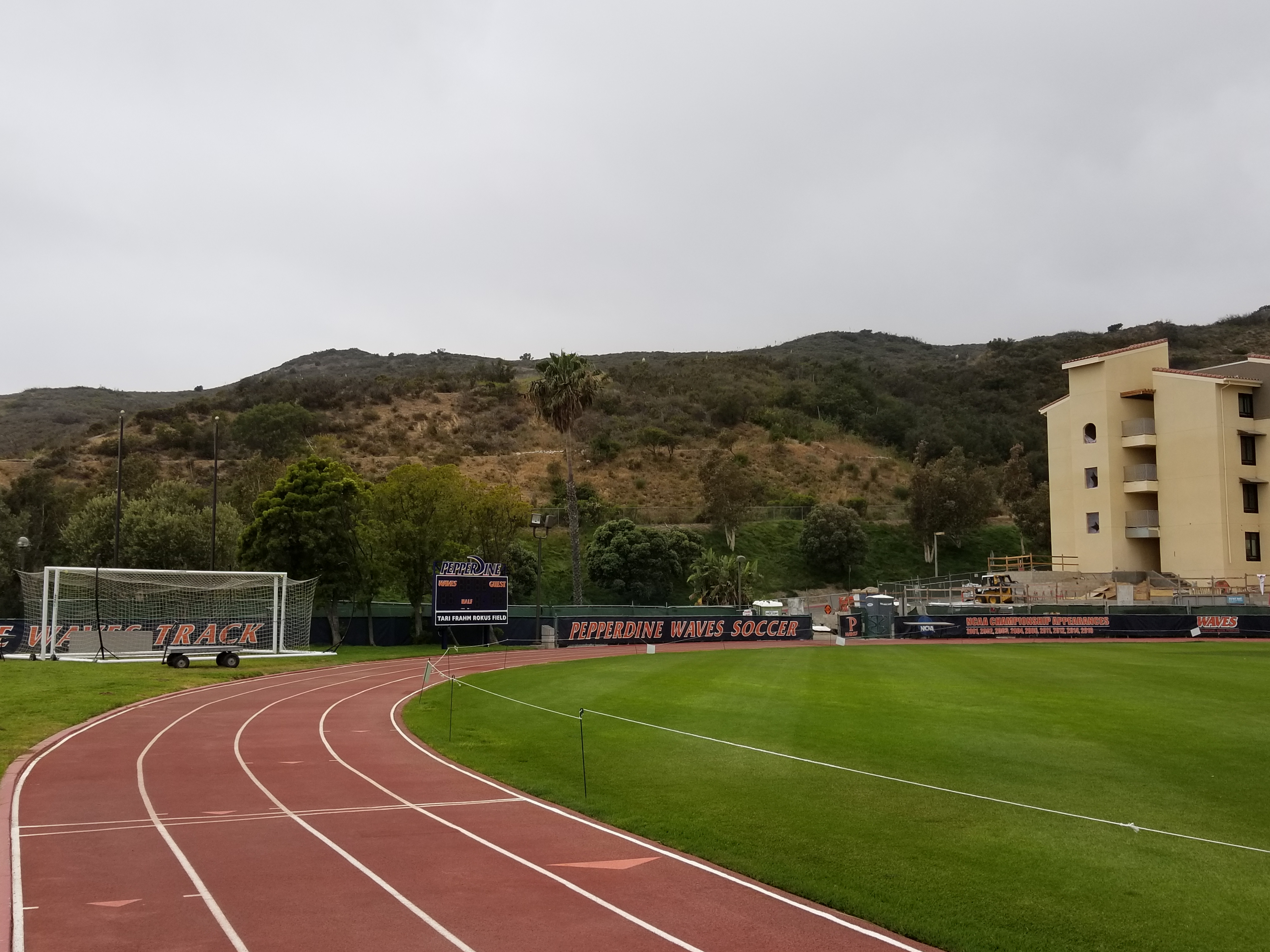
Frahm Rokus Field and track

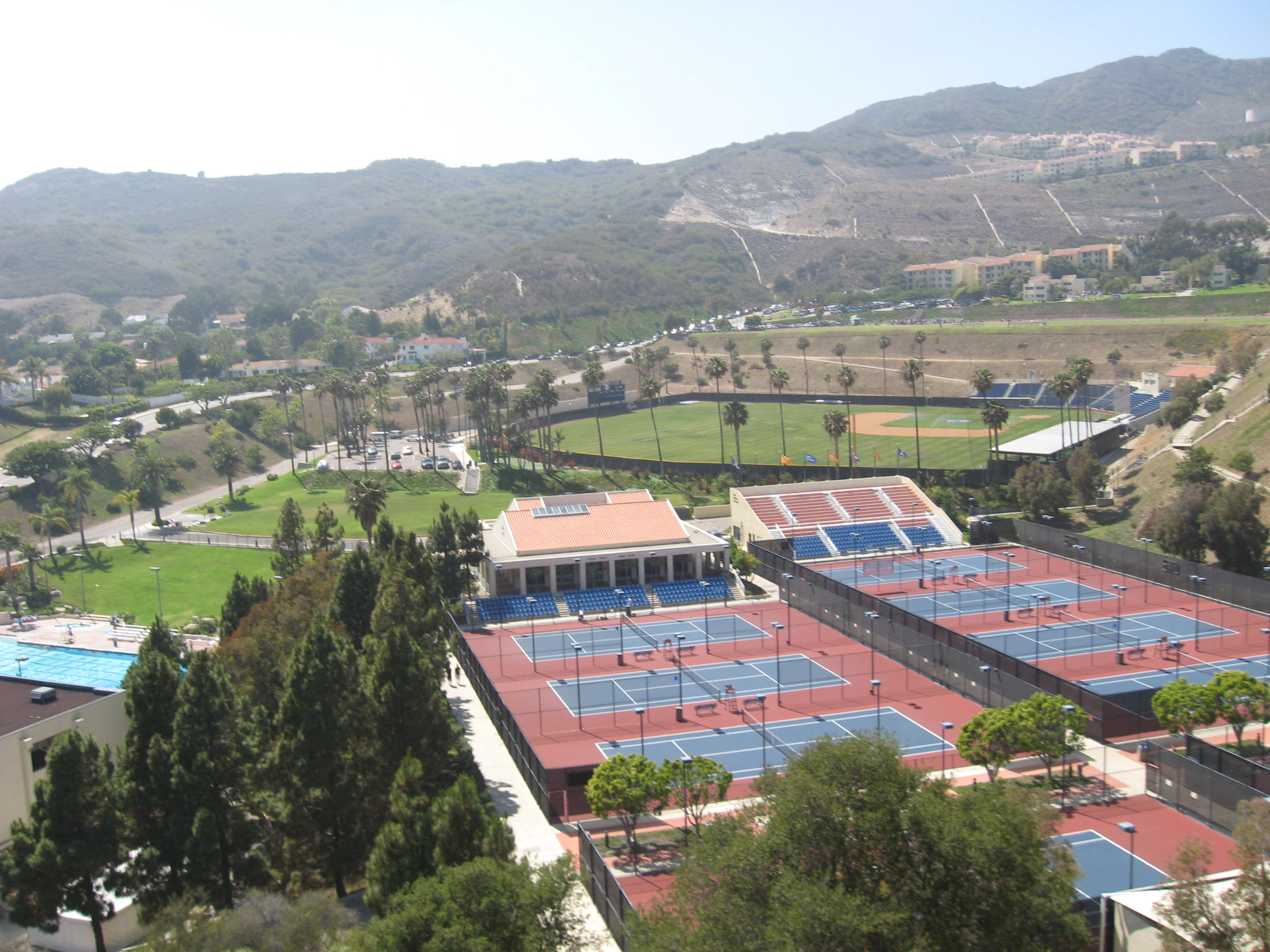
Tennis courts

Venue	Sport	Opened
Eddy D. Field Stadium	Baseball	1973
Firestone Fieldhouse	Basketball	1973
Firestone Fieldhouse	Volleyball	1973
Raleigh Runnels Memorial Pool	Swimming	1975
Raleigh Runnels Memorial Pool	Water polo	1975
Ralphs-Straus Tennis Center	Tennis	n/a
Stotsenberg Track	Track & field	n/a
Tari Frahm Rokus Field	Soccer	1993
Athletics Performance Center	Training facilities	n/a
Alumni Park (Note: Not owned by the University but a public place.)	Cross country	n/a
Zuma Beach	Beach volleyball	n/a

== Traditions ==
=== Mascot ===
The school's first mascot was Roland the Wave (a nod to the popular cheer "Roll on you Waves!"). From 1945 to 1950 the school used a wave costume (less amorphous than the current mascot's) on the sidelines. In 1951, Joe the Pelican was introduced at a football game. The idea was quickly dropped, however, because of the expense of caring for a live pelican. In 1952, Willy the Wave made his debut. Willy has always had the head and "hair" of a wave, though he has gone through several costumes, including one with white hair representing the foam of a wave, and the early 1990s version which bore a strong resemblance to the Mac Tonight mascot of Kraft Macaroni & Cheese commercials at the time. In 1996, Willy was replaced with King Neptune as part of a re-branding effort. The nickname never took off, however, and was scrapped in 2003. It was not until 2006, however, that Willy made his final return to Pepperdine athletics, this time with a larger wave head and usually wearing boardshorts and an Aloha shirt.

=== School colors ===
Since the founding, the school's colors have been blue and orange. They were chosen by President Baxter over the final choice of blue and gold as at the time, no other Pacific school used the colors, which represented the blue of the Pacific Ocean and the oranges grown by the state of California. (Cal State Fullerton has since adopted similar colors, though their shades are darker than Pepperdine's.)
