= Mike Gates =

American baseball player (born 1956)

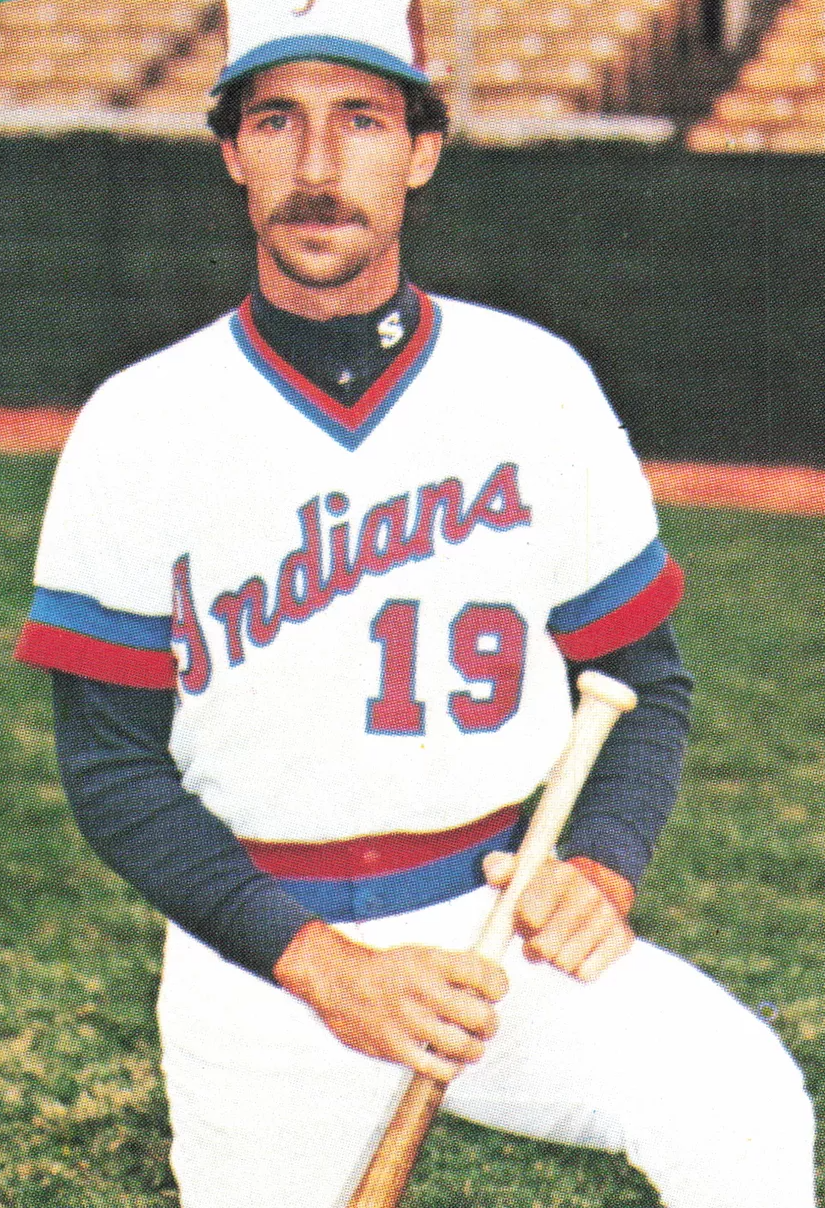
- Gates with the Indianapolis Indians c. 1984
- Second baseman
- Born: September 20, 1956 (age 69); Culver City, California, U.S.
- Batted: Left Threw: Right

MLB debut
- May 6, 1981, for the Montreal Expos

Last MLB appearance
- July 30, 1982, for the Montreal Expos

MLB statistics
- Batting average: .236
- Home runs: 0
- Runs batted in: 9
- Stats at Baseball Reference

Teams
- Montreal Expos (1981–1982)

Michael Grant Gates (born September 20, 1956) is an American former second baseman in Major League Baseball. He played for the Montreal Expos.
