= Farmdale, West Virginia =

Unincorporated community in West Virginia, United States

- Unincorporated community
- Location within West Virginia Location within the United States
- Coordinates: 37°54′17″N 80°42′39″W
- Country: United States
- State: West Virginia
- County: Greenbrier
- Elevation: 2,434 ft (742 m)
- Time zone: UTC-5 (Eastern (EST))
  - Summer (DST): UTC-4 (EDT)
- Area codes: 304 & 681
- GNIS feature ID: 1554445

Farmdale is an unincorporated community in Greenbrier County, West Virginia, United States. Farmdale is 4 miles (6.4 km) south-southwest of Rupert.
