= Farmdale station =

Los Angeles Metro Rail station

Farmdale
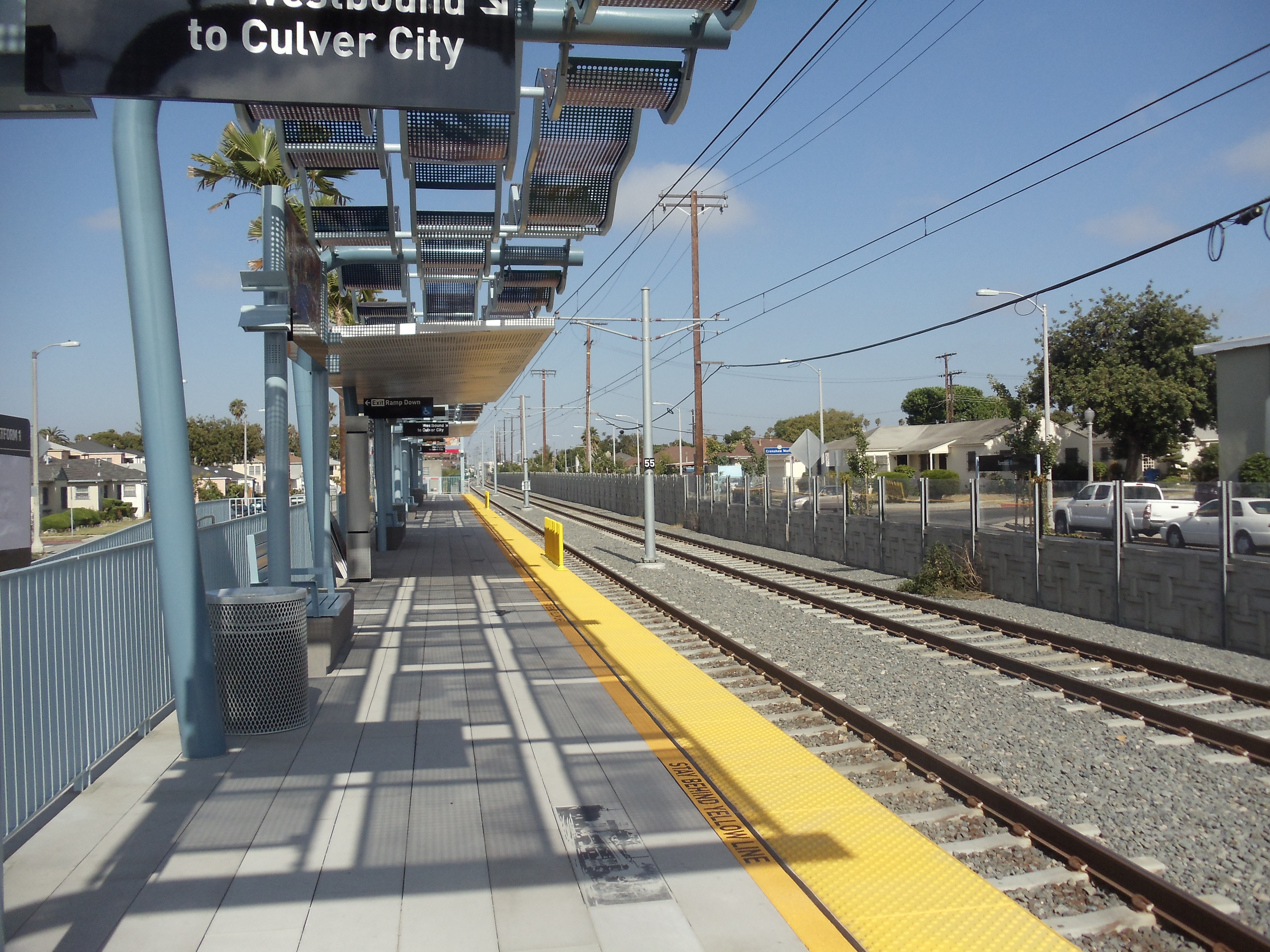
- Farmdale station platform, 2012

General information
- Location: 4420 West Exposition Boulevard; Los Angeles, California
- Coordinates: 34.0240°N 118.3460°W
- Owner: Los Angeles County Metropolitan Transportation Authority
- Platforms: 2 nearside side platforms
- Tracks: 2
- Connections: Los Angeles Metro Bus

Construction
- Structure type: At-grade
- Cycle facilities: Racks
- Accessible: Yes

History
- Opened: October 17, 1875
- Closed: September 30, 1953
- Rebuilt: June 20, 2012
- Former names: Cienega

Passengers
- FY 2025: 910 (avg. wkdy boardings)

Services
Preceding station	Metro Rail	Following station
Expo/La Brea toward Santa Monica	E Line	Expo/Crenshaw toward East LA
Former services
Preceding station	Pacific Electric	Following station
Airville toward Rustic Canyon	Air Line	11th Avenue toward Pacific Electric Building
Location

Farmdale station is an at-grade light rail station on the E Line of the Los Angeles Metro Rail system. The station is located in the center median of Exposition Boulevard at its intersection with Farmdale Avenue, after which the station is named, in the West Adams neighborhood of Los Angeles. It is located between Expo/La Brea station to the west and Expo/Crenshaw station to the east.

== History ==
Originally a stop on the Los Angeles and Independence and Pacific Electric railroads, it closed on September 30, 1953, with closure of the Santa Monica Air Line. It was completely rebuilt for the opening of the Expo Line from little more than a station stop marker. It opened on Wednesday, June 20, 2012, in conjunction with the line's extension to Culver City station. This was a month after the segment of the line opened on Saturday, April 28, 2012, between La Cienega/Jefferson station to the west and the Flower/Washington junction with the Blue Line to the east. This makes Farmdale station the first and only infill station on the Los Angeles Metro Rail system.

In the Expo Phase 1 project's Final Environmental Impact Report (EIR), the Expo Authority recommended (and the Metro Board approved) an at-grade crossing at Farmdale Avenue. Some members of the community, as well as the LAUSD, objected to the at-grade crossing, citing safety concerns for students of Dorsey High School (which is adjacent to the crossing). On February 20, 2009, the California Public Utilities Commission (CPUC) denied the Expo Authority's request for an at-grade crossing. In response, on July 29, 2009, the Expo Authority proposed four alternatives to grade separation. One of these proposals, a station at Farmdale, was reviewed by the assigned Administrative Law Judge of the CPUC. In her written decision dated March 22, 2010, the judge ruled that the Farmdale Station could be added to the project by including a CPUC-approved Addendum to the Final EIR, without having to redo the entire project's EIR. The final decision to authorize the grade crossing (and thus, construction of Farmdale Station) was made by the commission on July 29, 2010. All trains operating on the Expo line would be required to come to a complete stop at the Farmdale station, which features near-side stations at the intersection of Farmdale Avenue, thus increasing safety for pedestrians and students in the area.

== Service ==
=== Station layout ===
The station has "nearside" platforms: this means that the platforms are positioned on opposite sides of the intersection, and trains stop at the platform before crossing the intersection.

=== Hours and frequency ===
E Line service hours are from approximately 4:30 a.m. and 11:45 p.m daily. Trains operate every 8 minutes during peak hours, Monday to Friday. Trains run every 10 minutes, during midday on weekdays and weekends, from 9:00 a.m. to 7:00 p.m. Night and early morning service is approximately every 20 minutes every day.

=== Connections ===
As of December 15, 2024, the following connections are available:

- Los Angeles Metro Bus: 38

== Notable places nearby ==
The station is within walking distance of the following notable places:

- Susan Miller Dorsey High School
- Michelle and Barack Obama Sports Complex
