= Larry Lee (baseball) =

American baseball coach (born 1959)

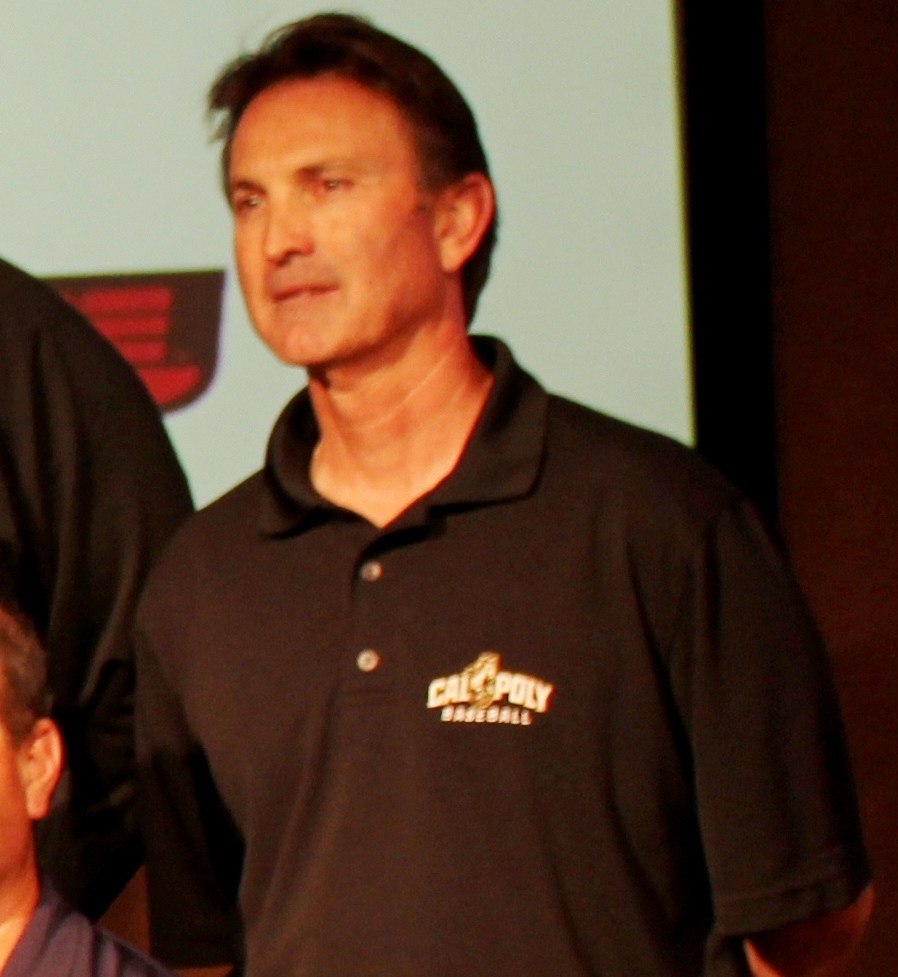
- Lee in 2011

Current position
- Title: Head coach
- Team: Cal Poly
- Conference: Big West
- Record: 752–576–2 (.566)

Biographical details
- Born: December 12, 1959 (age 66); San Luis Obispo, California, U.S.

Playing career
- 1980: Santa Barbara CC
- 1981: Orange Coast
- 1982–1983: Pepperdine
- Positions: Second baseman Third baseman

Coaching career (HC unless noted)
- 1984–1985: Cuesta (asst.)
- 1986: Cal Poly (asst.)
- 1987–2002: Cuesta
- 2003–present: Cal Poly

Head coaching record
- Overall: 460–241–3 (.656) (junior college); 752–576–2 (.566) (NCAA)
- Tournaments: NCAA: 8–10

Accomplishments and honors

Championships
- 3× WSC (1990, 1991, 1994); 6× WSC North Division (1997, 1998, 1999, 2000, 2001, 2002); 2x Big West (2014, 2026); Big West tournament (2025); NCAA Regional (2026)

Awards
- 8× WSC Coach of the Year (1990, 1994, 1997–2002); 2× Big West Coach of the Year (2014, 2026)

Larry Patrick Lee (born December 12, 1959) is an American college baseball coach, currently serving as the head coach of the Cal Poly Mustangs baseball team. He began this job prior to the 2003 season.

== Playing career ==
After graduating from San Luis Obispo High School in 1979, Lee played at two junior colleges, Santa Barbara City College in 1980 and Orange Coast College and 1981, before using his final two years of eligibility at Pepperdine. He then played briefly as a professional, appearing with the Class-A Utica Blue Sox in 1983.

== Coaching career ==
Lee coached for sixteen years at Cuesta College, a community college in San Luis Obispo, California. He was named head coach at Cal Poly, also in San Luis Obispo, to replace Ritch Price, the school's first Division I coach, with the official announcement of his introduction taking place on July 22, 2002.

Lee built on Price's success with the Mustangs, earning the school's first invitation to the NCAA tournament in 2009. As of 2023, he has coached 13 All-Americans and 79 players who would later sign professional contracts.

== Personal life ==
Lee and his wife, Liz, have a son and a daughter together. Their son, Brooks, played on the Cal Poly baseball team and was a first-round selection in the 2022 Major League Baseball draft.

== Head coaching record ==
=== CCCAA ===
The table below shows Lee's record as a junior college head coach.

Record table
Season	Team	Overall	Conference	Standing	Postseason
Cuesta Cougars (Western State Conference) (1987–2002)
1987	Cuesta	20–14	13–11	2nd (North)	
1988	Cuesta	22–18	13–11	4th (North)	
1989	Cuesta	9–25	4–16	11th	
1990	Cuesta	23–15–2	15–5	T–1st	
1991	Cuesta	24–14	14–6	T–1st	
1992	Cuesta	25–18	12–8	4th	CCCAA Semifinals
1993	Cuesta	18–19	17–13	4th	
1994	Cuesta	36–14	19–3	1st	
1995	Cuesta	20–23–1	12–14	4th (North)	
1996	Cuesta	33–14	20–6	2nd (North)	
1997	Cuesta	44–11	23–3	1st (North)	CCCAA Final Four
1998	Cuesta	33–8	19–5	1st (North)	CCCAA Regional
1999	Cuesta	37–12	21–4	1st (North)	CCCAA Regional
2000	Cuesta	34–13	21–6	1st (North)	CCCAA Regional
2001	Cuesta	36–12	21–5	1st (North)	CCCAA Final Four
2002	Cuesta	43–9	23–3	1st (North)	CCCAA Final Four
Cuesta:		460–241–3 (.656)	267–119 (.692)		
Total:		460–241–3 (.656)			
National champion Postseason invitational champion Conference regular season champion Conference regular season and conference tournament champion Division regular season champion Division regular season and conference tournament champion Conference tournament champion

=== NCAA ===
The table below shows Lee's record as a head coach at the NCAA Division I level.

Record table
Season	Team	Overall	Conference	Standing	Postseason
Cal Poly Mustangs (Big West Conference) (2003–present)
2003	Cal Poly	27–28–1	9–12	4th	
2004	Cal Poly	38–23–1	10–11	T–4th	
2005	Cal Poly	36–20	14–7	T–2nd	
2006	Cal Poly	29–27	10–11	4th	
2007	Cal Poly	32–24	13–8	4th	
2008	Cal Poly	24–32	8–16	T–7th	
2009	Cal Poly	37–21	14–10	3rd	NCAA Regional
2010	Cal Poly	23–32	10–14	T–5th	
2011	Cal Poly	27–26	15–9	3rd	
2012	Cal Poly	36–20	16–8	2nd	
2013	Cal Poly	40–19	17–10	T–2nd	NCAA Regional
2014	Cal Poly	47–12	19–5	1st	NCAA Regional
2015	Cal Poly	27–27	14–10	4th	
2016	Cal Poly	32–25	12–12	T–4th	
2017	Cal Poly	28–28	16–8	2nd	
2018	Cal Poly	30–27	15–9	2nd	
2019	Cal Poly	28–28	17–7	T–2nd	
2020	Cal Poly	5–11	0–0		Season canceled due to COVID-19
2021	Cal Poly	31–25	21–19	T-4th	
2022	Cal Poly	37–21	22–8	2nd	
2023	Cal Poly	21–35	11–19	8th	
2024	Cal Poly	35–22	20–10	T-3rd	
2025	Cal Poly	43–19	23–7	2nd	NCAA Regional
2026	Cal Poly	39–24	22–8	T-1st	NCAA Super Regional
Cal Poly:		752–576–2 (.566)	325–231 (.585)		
Total:		752–576–2 (.566)			
National champion Postseason invitational champion Conference regular season champion Conference regular season and conference tournament champion Division regular season champion Division regular season and conference tournament champion Conference tournament champion

== See also ==
- List of current NCAA Division I baseball coaches
