= Cuesta College =

Community college in San Luis Obispo, California, US

- Type: Public community college
- Established: 1963; 63 years ago
- Endowment: $46.7 million (2024)
- President: Jill Stearns
- Faculty: 128 full-time 317 part-time
- Administrative staff: 55
- Students: 11,019
- Location: San Luis Obispo, California, United States; 35°19′47.89″N 120°44′32.47″W
- Campus: Suburban, 150 acres (61 ha)
- Colors: Green and white
- Nickname: Cougars
- Sporting affiliations: CCCAA – WSC, SCWA (wrestling)
- Website: www.cuesta.edu

Cuesta College is a public community college in San Luis Obispo County, California.

== History ==
The first community college in the San Luis Obispo area was founded in 1916 as a San Luis Obispo High School division. It lasted until 1919 with the United States involved in World War I. Cal Poly had a junior college division from 1927 to 1932. Miramonte College of Atascadero filled the void as a private institution from 1933 to 1936. The county's second public junior college was formed in 1936 as a part of San Luis Obispo High School District but ceased operation in June 1959.

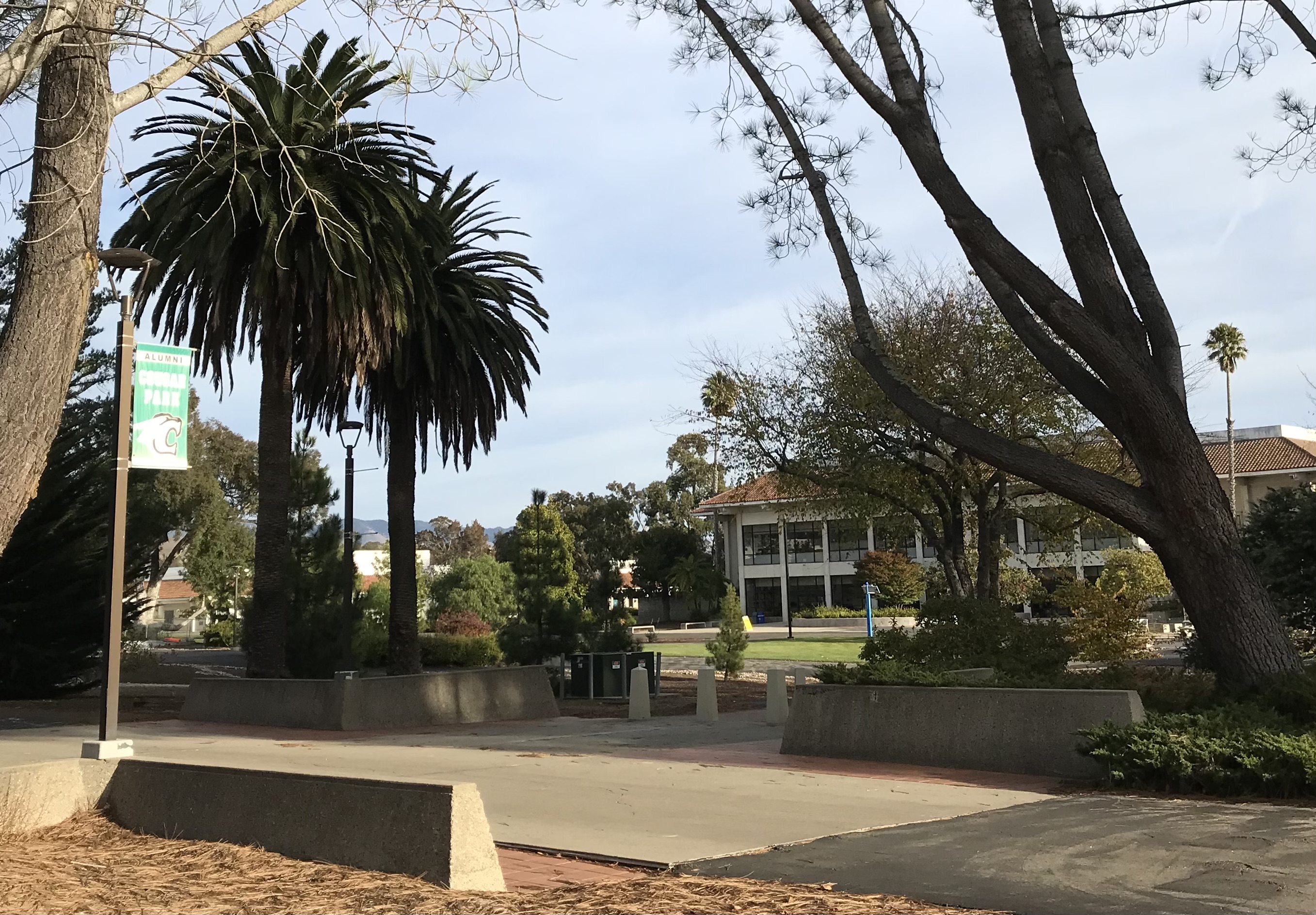
Cuesta College's Cougar Park, 2022

On April 16, 1963, voters in SLO County agreed to form a community college district, forming the San Luis Obispo County Junior College District.

In 1964, a limited evening division began at Camp San Luis Obispo, a California National Guard facility located between San Luis Obispo and Morro Bay.

On October 4, 1965, the college was officially named Cuesta College.

Five years later, following the approval of a $5 million bond, Cuesta broke ground on its current main campus west of Camp San Luis Obispo to establish a 127-acre site including frontage property deeded to the college by the National Guard.

== Campus ==
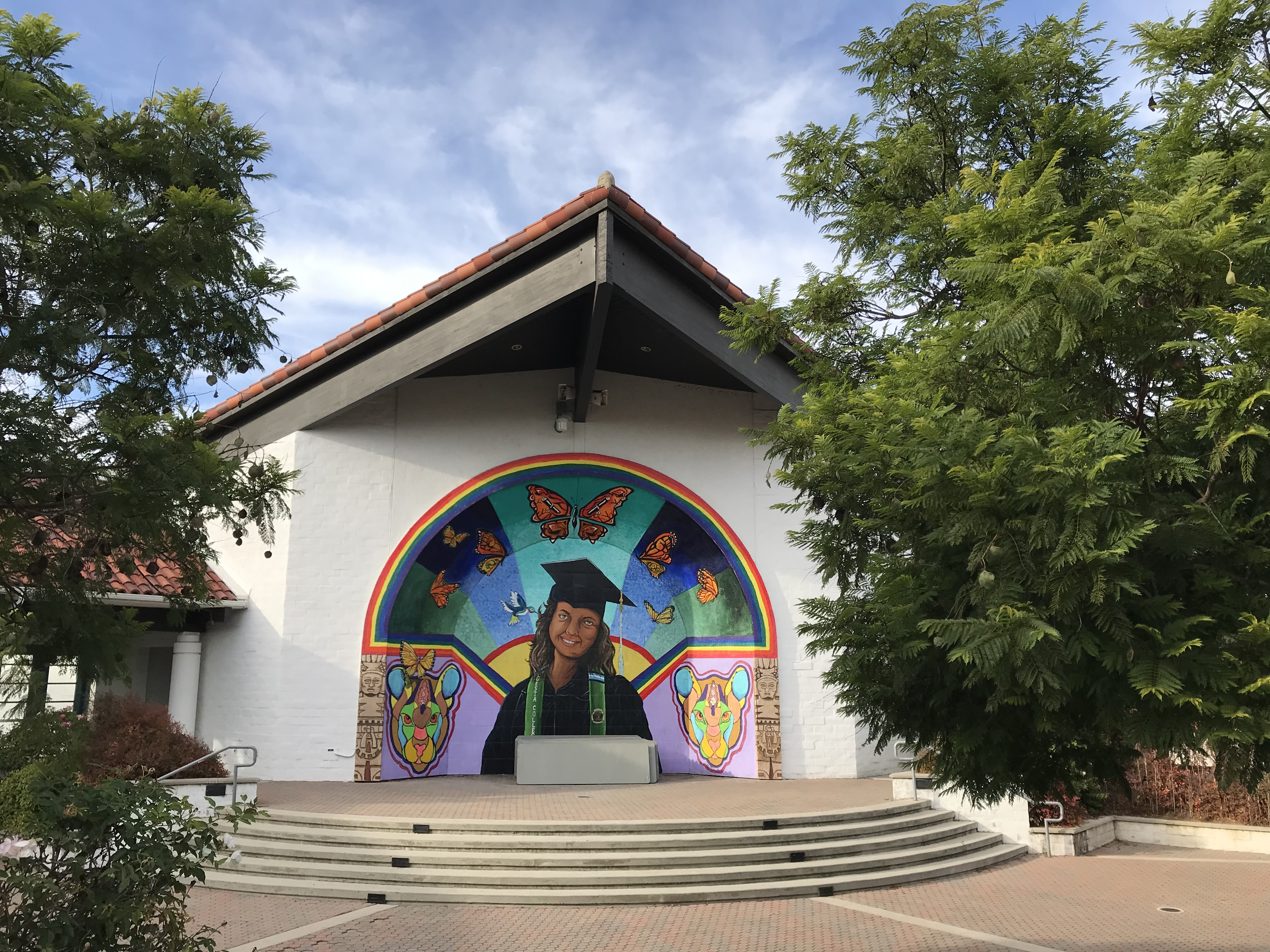
Cuesta College's Associated Students Auditorium, 2022

Located on State Route 1, the main Cuesta campus is six miles (9.7 km) from the beaches of the Pacific Ocean and six miles (9.7 km) from San Luis Obispo. Cuesta College also has a satellite campus, 'North County Campus', in Paso Robles, which is twenty-nine miles (47 km) to the northeast of the main campus near San Luis Obispo. Limited course offerings are also available at two other sites within the county operated by Cuesta College, one at Arroyo Grande High School in Arroyo Grande and the other at Nipomo High School in Nipomo. The original campus features a science forum including an observatory for astronomy courses, now named Bowen Celestial Observatory. With a 14-inch telescope including a special narrow wavelength-band filter, the observatory has been used since the 1970s, occasionally open to the public for viewing of events such as visible comets and solar eclipses.

The North County Campus opened in August 1998, with the very first structures donated by Vandenberg Air Force Base.

Cuesta's San Luis Obispo campus features a radio station, KGUR. The radio station has been streaming on Twitch in recent years, and has a significant following on Instagram. The radio station is part of the FTVE Program (Film, TV and Electronic Media), and hosts a variety of shows, one of them being Cuesta Sports Monthly. The department is run by one professor, John Arno, since 2007, and the program director, Nessie Lane Atwood, since 2017.

Since April 2009, Cuesta's main campus has hosted acclaimed authors to speak at its annual Book of the Year event series, including Julie Otsuka for the debut visit, Sonia Nazario in 2010, Novella Carpenter in 2011, Vanessa Diffenbaugh in 2013, Kevin Powers in 2015, Hector Tobar in 2016, Rebecca Skloot in 2017, Ron Suskind in 2018, Ana Castillo in 2019, Tommy Orange in 2022, Sabaa Tahir in 2023, Myriam Gurba in 2024, and Daniel Gumbiner in 2025.

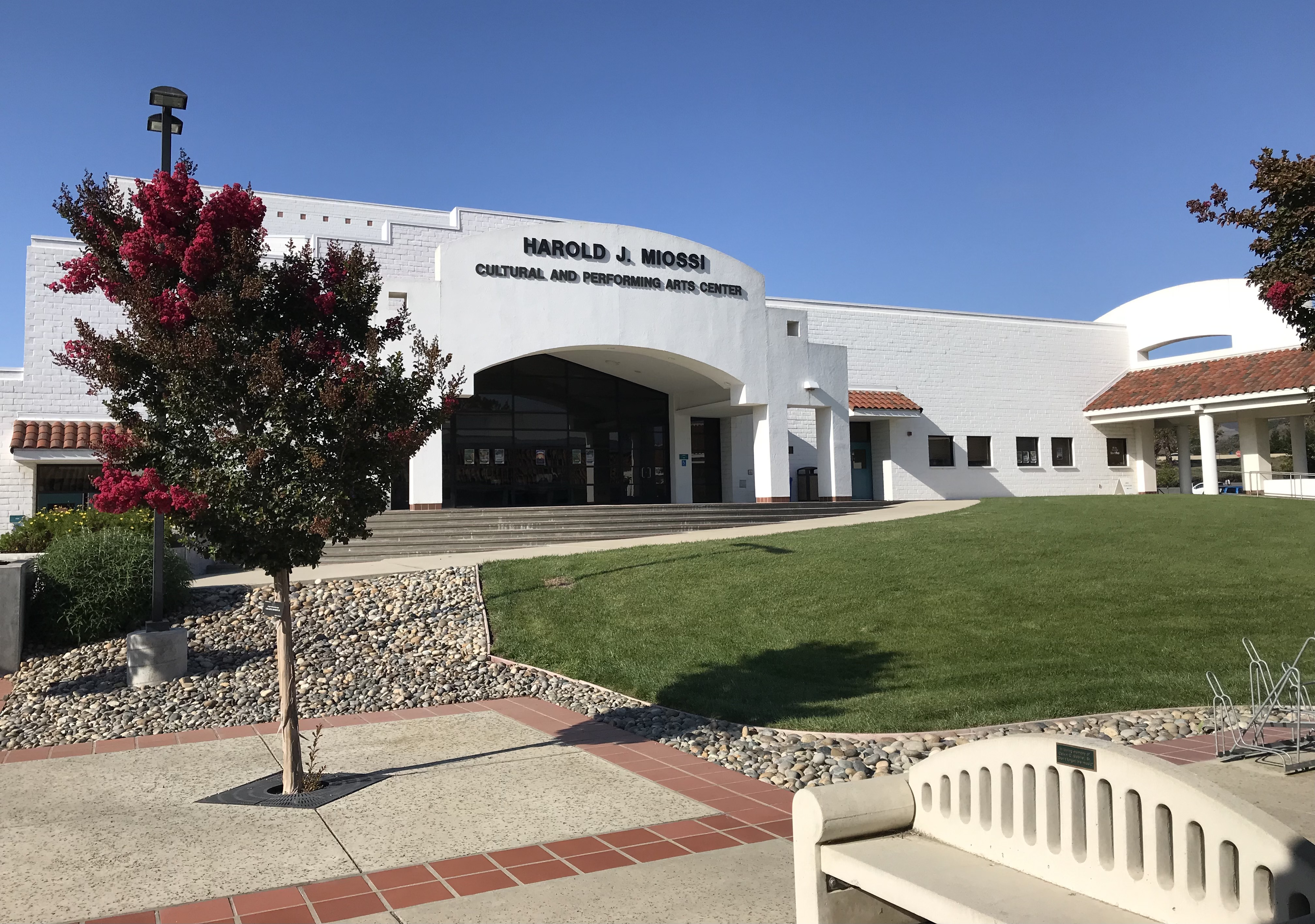
The Harold J. Miossi Cultural and Performing Arts Center, 2022

Cuesta's Paso Robles campus opened a new student center featuring a cafeteria, student lounge, and Pearson VUE-administered CBEST and CSET testing stations, in June 2018.

Also in 2018, the college's San Luis Obispo campus received a $1.5 million gift from the Harold J. Miossi Charitable Trust; the donation toward Cuesta's Cultural and Performing Arts Center was the second-largest in the institution's then-55-year history. The center, featuring a 450-seat main theater as well as a 100-seat experimental theater, plus teaching facilities, was thereafter renamed as the Harold J. Miossi Cultural and Performing Arts Center.

In 2019, the college's aquatics center, including a 50-meter competition pool along with a 25-yard training pool, was expanded following Measure L funding. The complex hosted the silver medal-winning U.S. men's national water polo team and the gold medalist synchronized swimming duo of Tracie Ruiz and Candy Costie during training sessions for the 1984 Summer Olympics.

== Organization and administration ==
Cuesta College is the only college in the San Luis Obispo County Community College District (or SLOCCCD, part of the California Community College system) and is accredited by the Accrediting Commission for Community and Junior Colleges. The district is governed by an elected five-member board of trustees.

Jill Stearns, the current president, began her presidency in July 2018 after Gilbert H. Stork retired. The gymnasium was renamed Gilbert H. Stork Gymnasium in his honor in August 2018.

== Academics ==
Student demographics as of Fall 2023
Race and ethnicity	Total
White	48%
Hispanic	37%
Multiracial	6%
Unknown	4%
Asian	3%
African American	2%

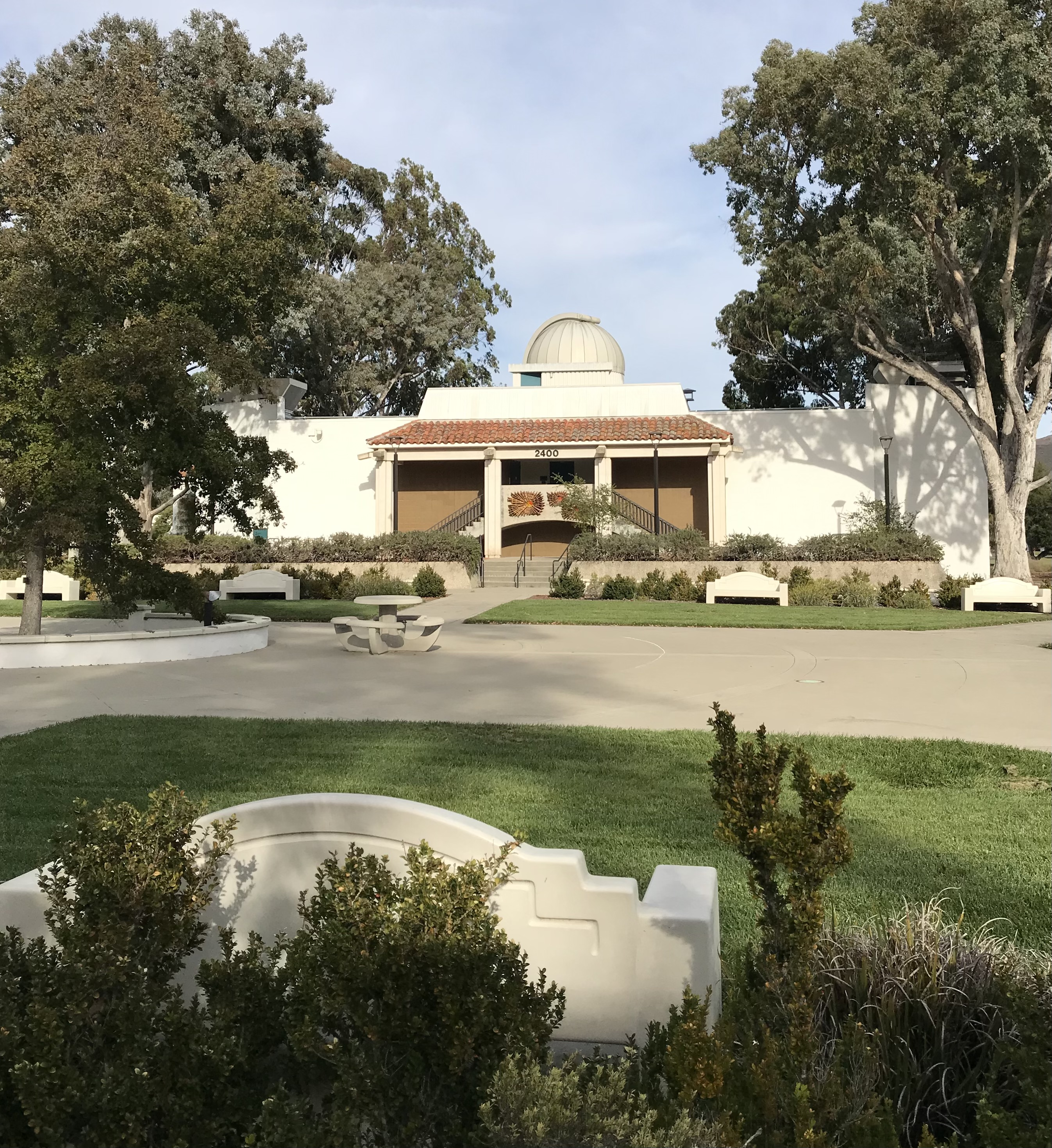
Cuesta College's Bowen Celestial Observatory, 1970s

The college offers 84 associate degree programs and 128 certificate programs. A number of Cuesta students transfer to the public California State University and University of California systems, including the nearby Cal Poly SLO campus, as well as private colleges and universities.

In 2012, Cuesta College's accreditor, the Western Association of Schools and Colleges placed the college on "show cause" status, warning the college that its accreditation might not be renewed. A year later, the college's accreditation was renewed and its status upgraded to "on warning". The Tribune, the local newspaper of San Luis Obispo, described this as the result of a "years-long struggle to fix several deficiencies identified by the commission [that] came at a cost: lower enrollment, difficulty recruiting applicants and damaged morale". In February 2014, Cuesta's "on warning" status was removed and the accreditor certified that the college met all of its standards.

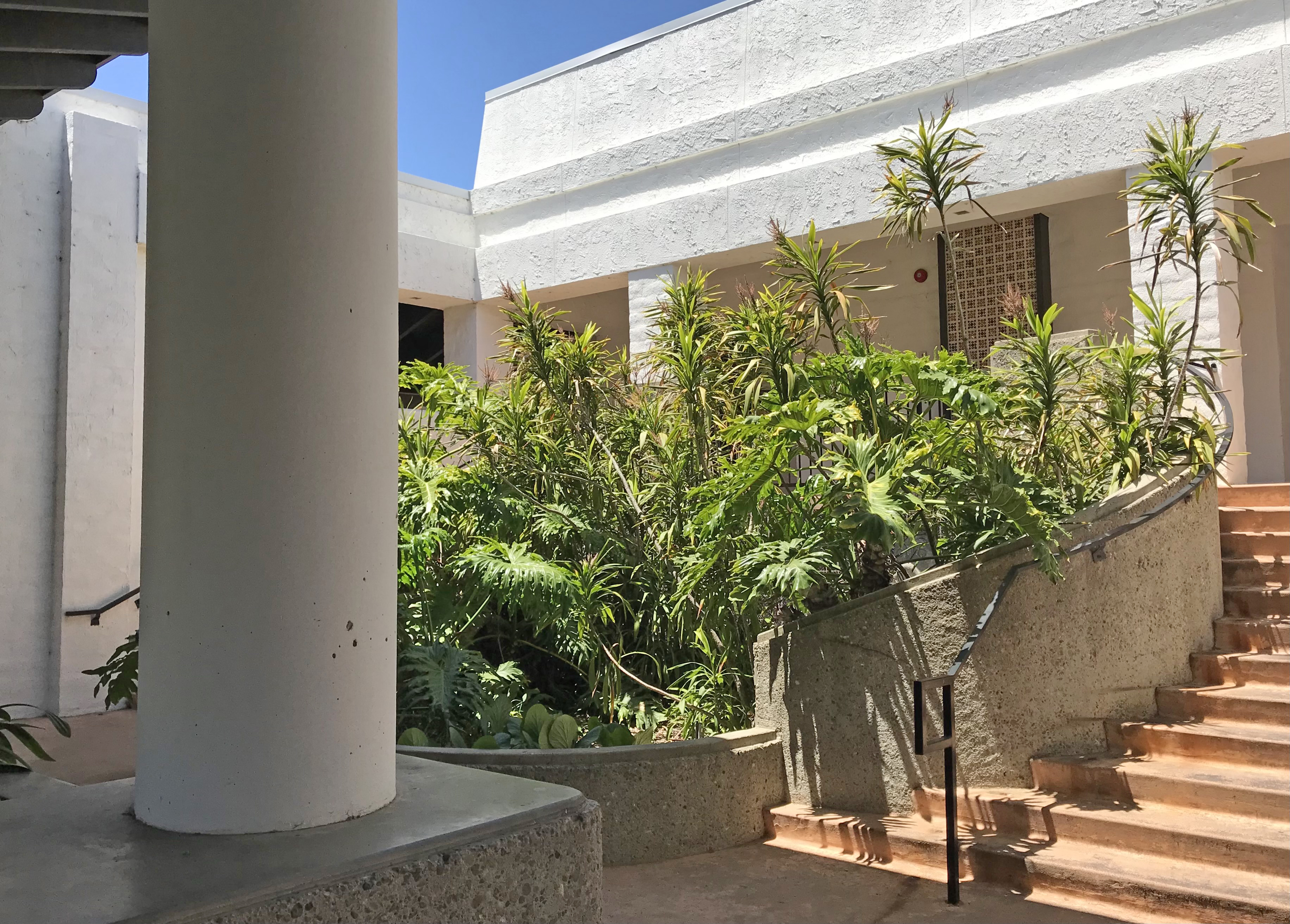
Cuesta College's Building, 2022.

The Cuesta welding team won first place in the theme category at the 2016 Welders Without Borders competition, and won gold in the welding fabrication competition at the SkillsUSA conference the same year. Ahead of the fall 2018 semester, the college added new courses in viticulture and geographic information systems.

In the spring semester of 2023, Cuesta launched a reportedly first-of-its-kind aviation maintenance technician program, with 25 students in the first cohort. The 18-month vocational program, which started in part from a $500,000 contribution via ACI Jet, is designed to prepare students to test for FAA mechanical licensing. In March 2025, the college received a $250,000 grant to fund a study regarding a permanent aviation-program building at the San Luis Obispo campus.,

With regard to students passing the National Council Licensure Examination (NCLEX), Cuesta's registered nursing graduating class of 2023 ranked as the top-scoring program across California. The college graduated more than 1,800 nurses from 1969 to 2018.

== Athletics ==
The college's athletic teams are known as the Cougars and the school colors are green and white. The college currently fields seven men's and nine women's varsity teams. It competes as a member of the California Community College Athletic Association (CCCAA) in the Western State Conference (WSC) for all sports except wrestling, which competes in the Southern California Wrestling Association (SCWA).

Several of the Cougars' programs compete in Dr. Stork Gym, named after former college president Gilbert H. Stork. In the mid-1980s to early 1990s, the gym also hosted the SLO County Basketball Camp which on multiple occasions featured clinics including instructor Bill Walton. Since the early 2010s, the arena space has also hosted Special Olympics annual Spring Regional Games.

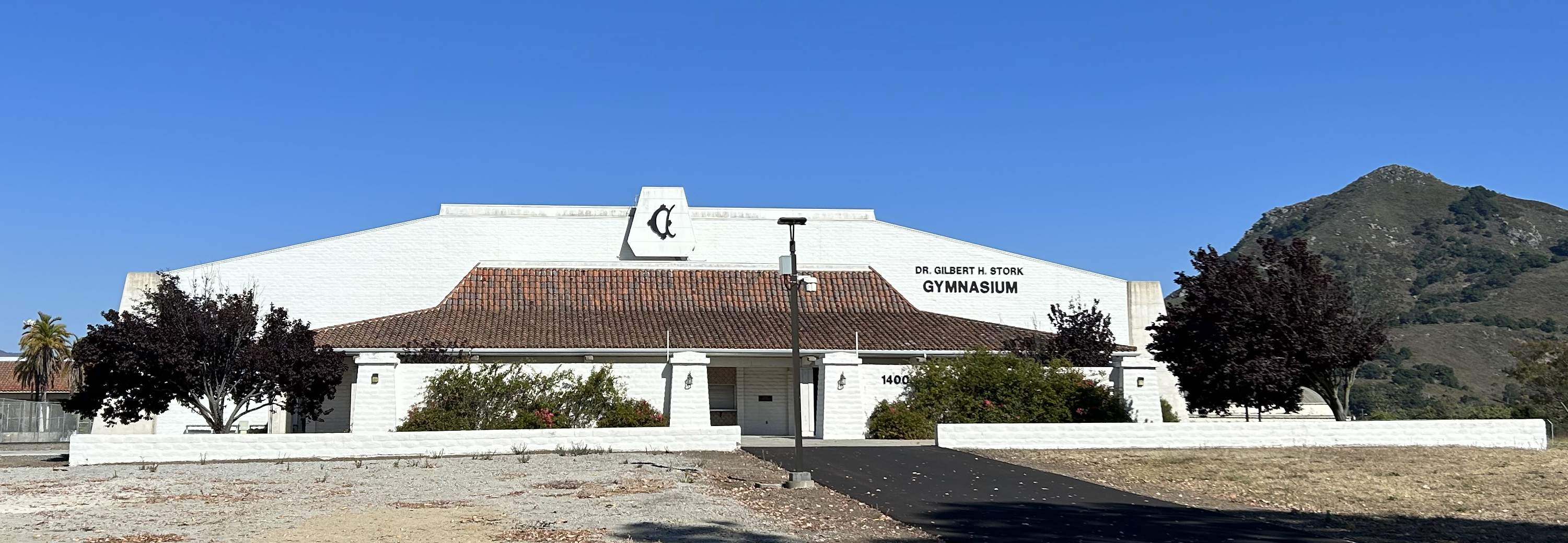
Cuesta College's Dr. Stork Gym

=== Baseball ===
Cuesta has advanced to the CCCAA final four on four occasions, including third-place finishes in 1997 (when the team tallied a state-leading 44 wins) and 2002. All-time, Cuesta has produced 52 MLB draft picks, including seven future Major League players.

=== Cross country ===
The Cougars have won three individual state titles, as Sean McDermott and Miranda Daschian claimed both CCCAA championships in the fall of 2016, before Weston Greenelsh finished first in 2024. Cuesta trains on its home venue, Fairbanks Cross Country course, which is located on the other side of the highway and has also served as the host facility for several Big West Championship meets.

=== Men's basketball ===
In the history of the Western State Conference, Cuesta accumulated 10 WSC North Division championships from 1981 through 2016, the second-most in the league; only Ventura College (with 13 such titles) won more in that time span. In 2019, Cougars head coach Rusty Blair won his 500th career victory with the college, becoming the 13th coach in state history to total at least a half-thousand wins. The 1996–97 academic year saw Cuesta set a program record for wins in a season (32), soon due to a CCCAA revision increased to 33 wins for an overall record of 33–5. The season included a February 12 victory over then-defending state champion Ventura, 98–87, with roughly 1,300 fans in attendance. On the Central Coast, at any level of college basketball, the 33-win total is tied as the second-most victories in a year, trailing only the 34–1 season of Allan Hancock College exactly four decades earlier in 1956–57.

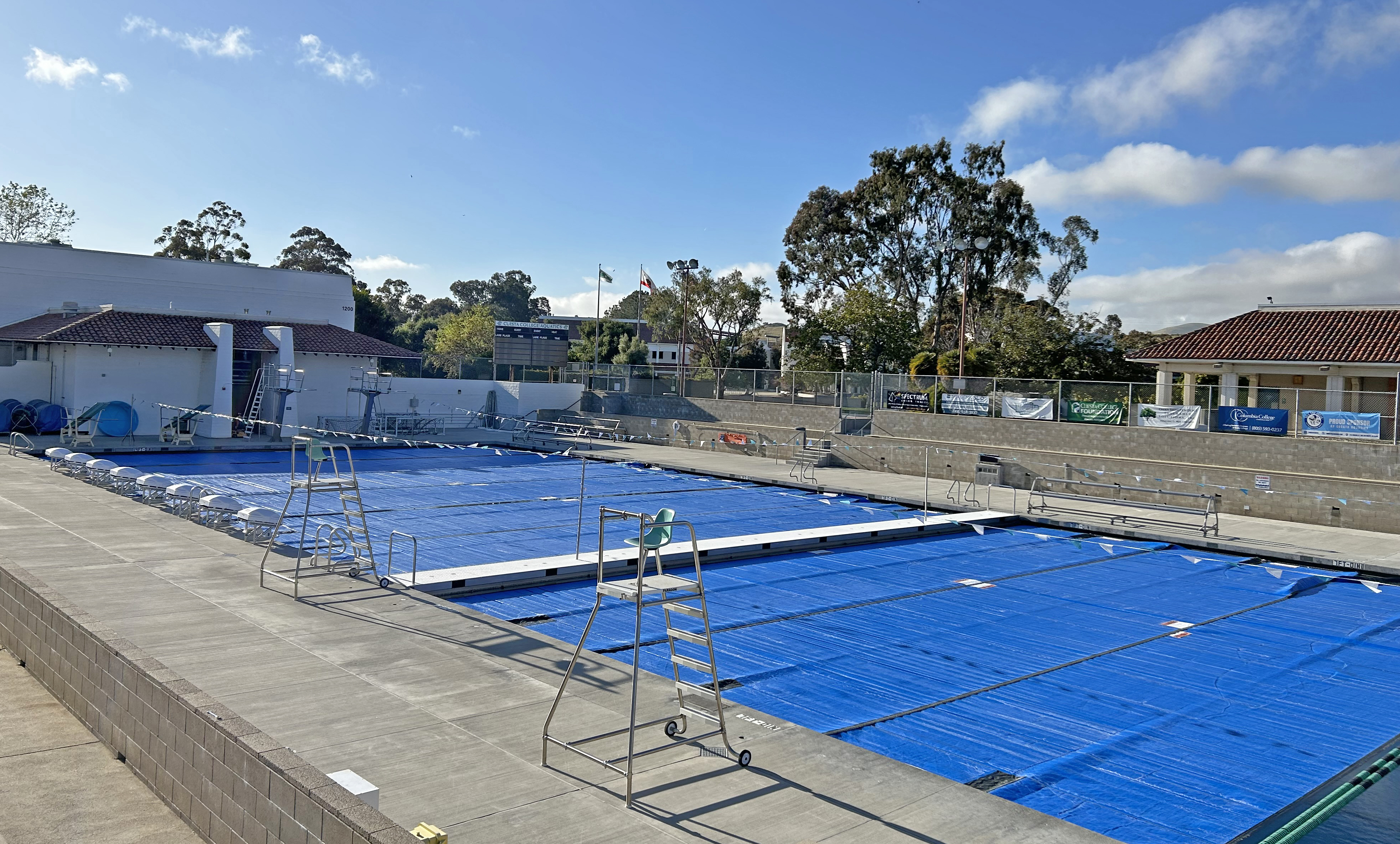
Cuesta College's aquatics complex, 2024.

=== Softball ===
The Cougars' highest finish in the state tournament has come in 2006, as the team placed sixth after advancing to the California Finals held at Big League Dreams Sports Park in Redding.

=== Water polo ===
Cuesta's men's water polo team, which has compiled more than 40 consecutive winning-record seasons, has advanced to the CCCAA final four on four occasions since 2005, including finishing in third place in the state in 2006 and 2023. The Cuesta women's water polo squad, which owns four WSC championships since 2000, saw its single-season goals record broken in 2022 by Arroyo Grande High School recruit Anna Kreowski (who scored a state-leading 142 times before transferring to Cal Baptist).

=== Women's basketball ===
During the 1981–82 season, Cuesta set a program record for winning percentage, going 19–1 overall (.950). The Cougars won the state's 1982 then-Division II championship in San Mateo, defeating Shasta College 68–59. LeAnne Armstrong scored 21 points in the title game and was named Tournament MVP.

=== Women's soccer ===
Cuesta advanced to the Southern California Regional second round in the 1998 postseason, the program's deepest run, defeating Orange Coast College 1–0 in the playoff opener before falling 1–0 at El Camino College. In 2019, Martha Mora, a recruit from nearby Cambria, broke the school record for goals, tallying 39 times during her Cougars career.

=== Women's volleyball ===
Cuesta won CCCAA state titles in 1979, 1985, and 1986.

=== Wrestling ===
The Cougars, coached by Gary Meissner, won the 1980 California Community College (then-Division II classification) state championship on February 9, 1980, at Chabot College. Cuesta scored 29 team points for the trophy.

== Gallery ==
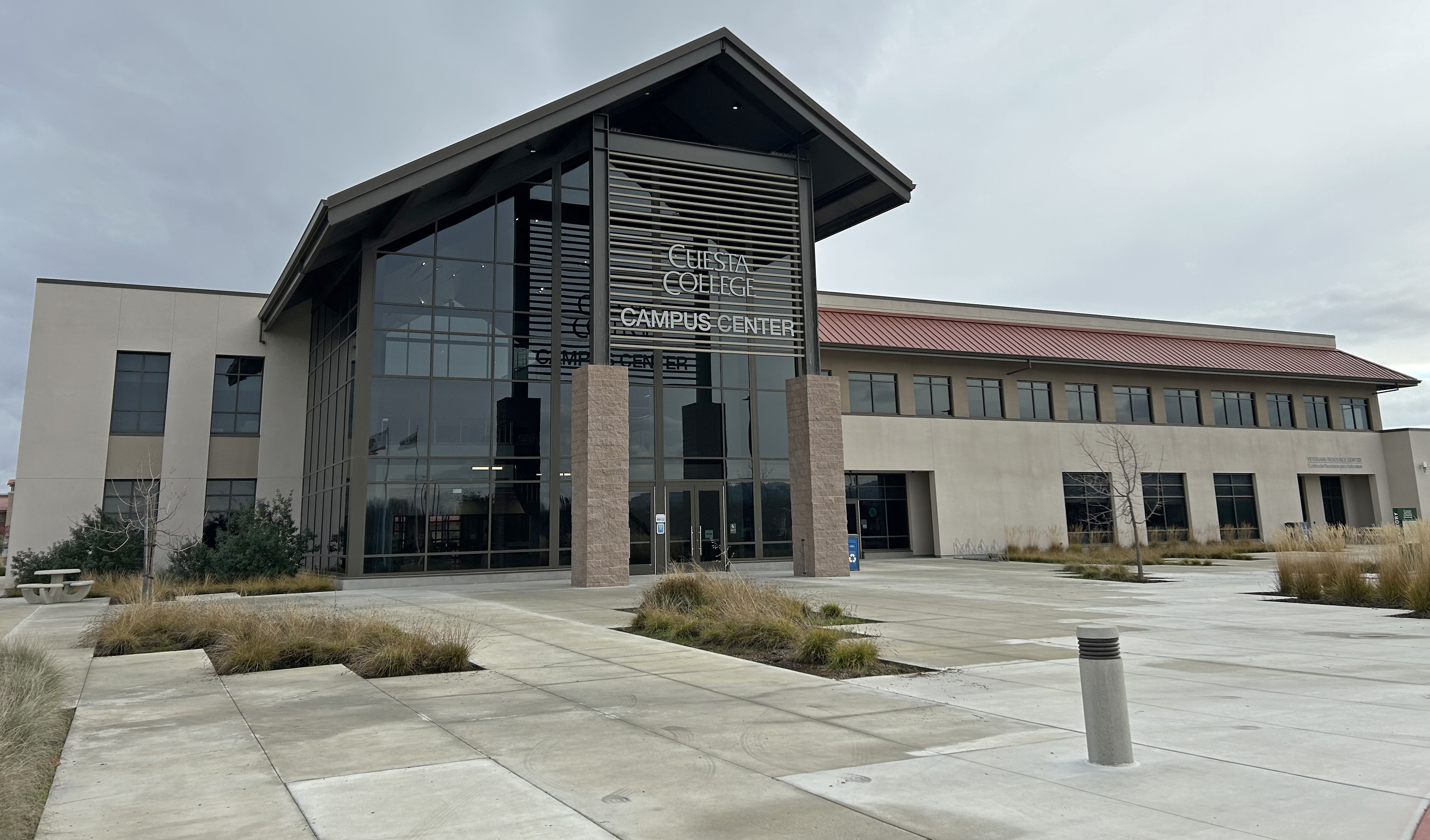
The North County Cuesta College Campus Center is pictured in December 2023.

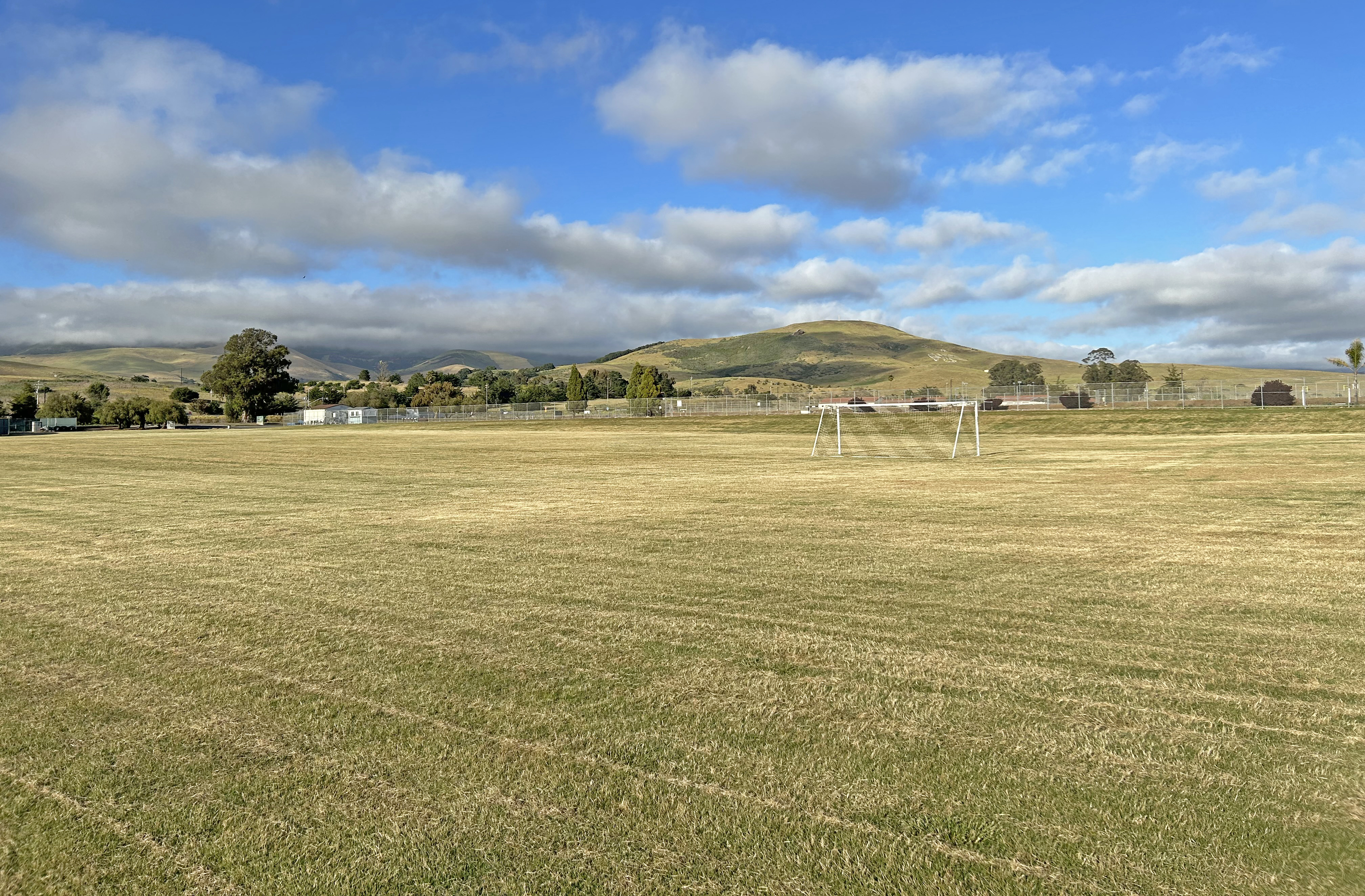
The Cuesta College Soccer Field is seen in 2024.

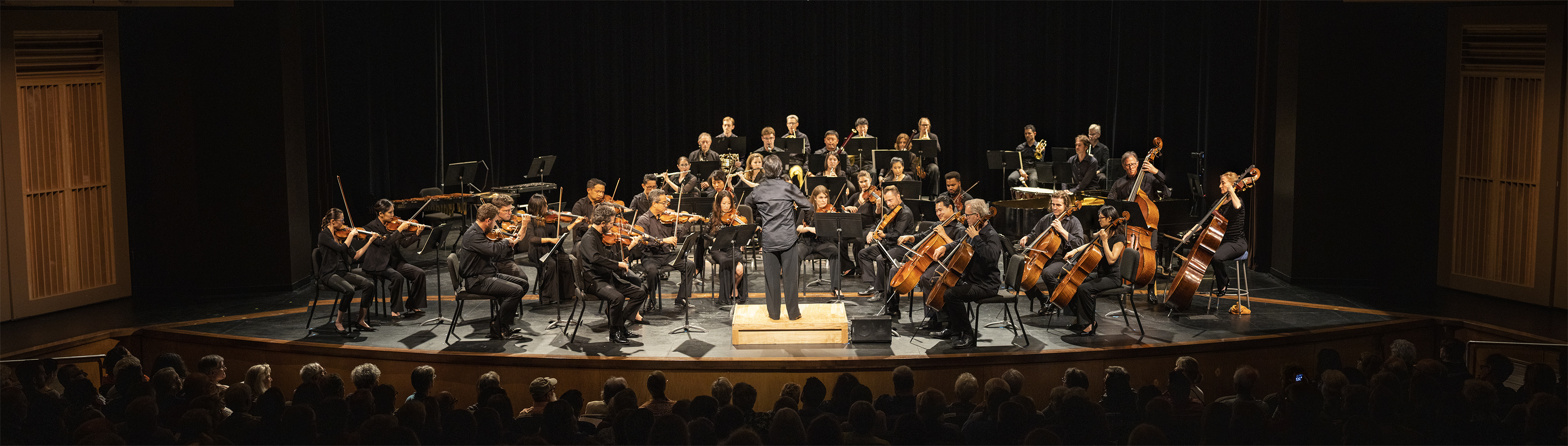
Cuesta College hosts the Festival Mozaic Orchestra in 2019 at the Miossi Center.

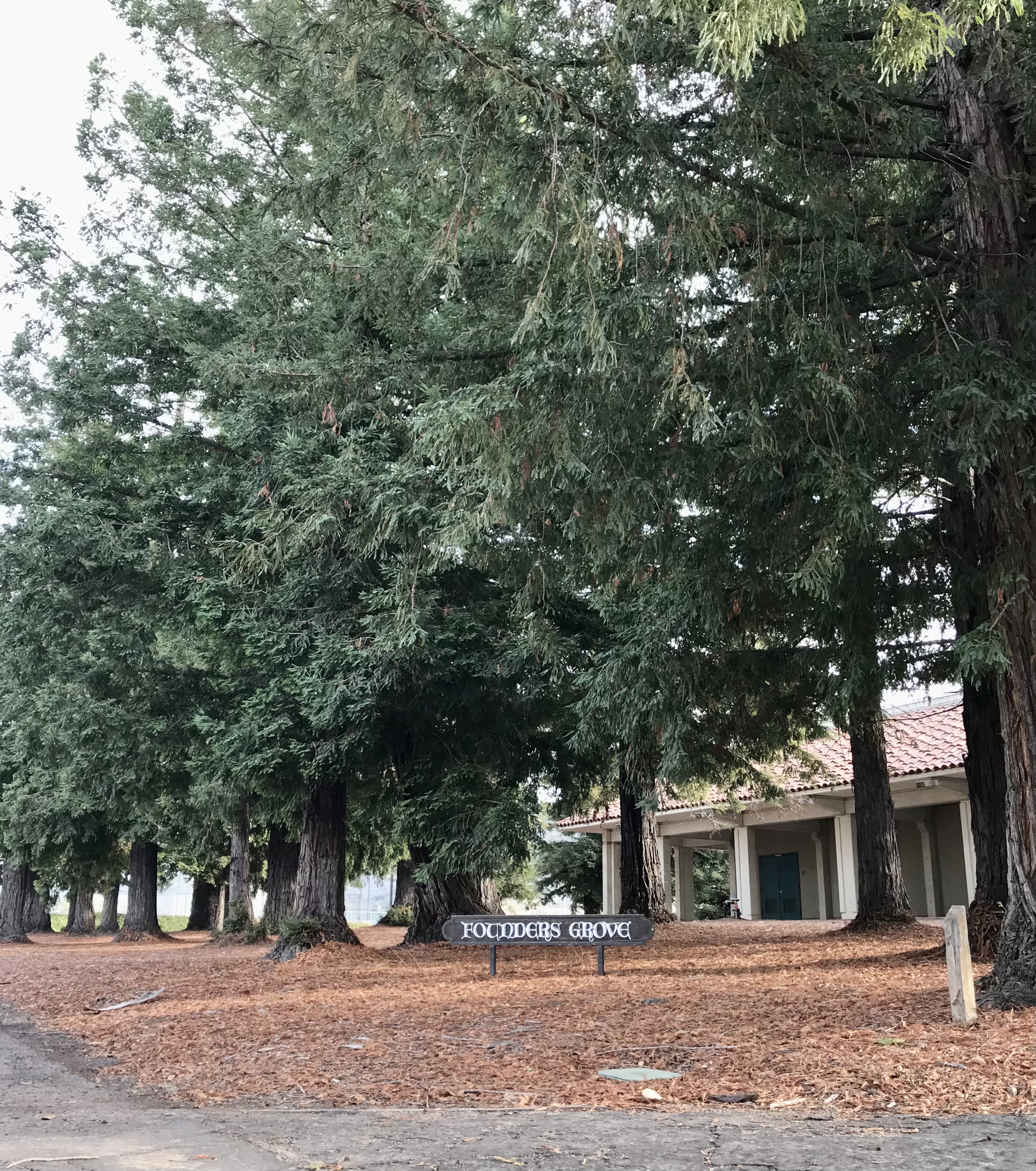
The Cuesta College Founders Grove, located behind Building 1100 on the main San Luis Obispo campus, leads up to the Cougar Soccer Expanse.

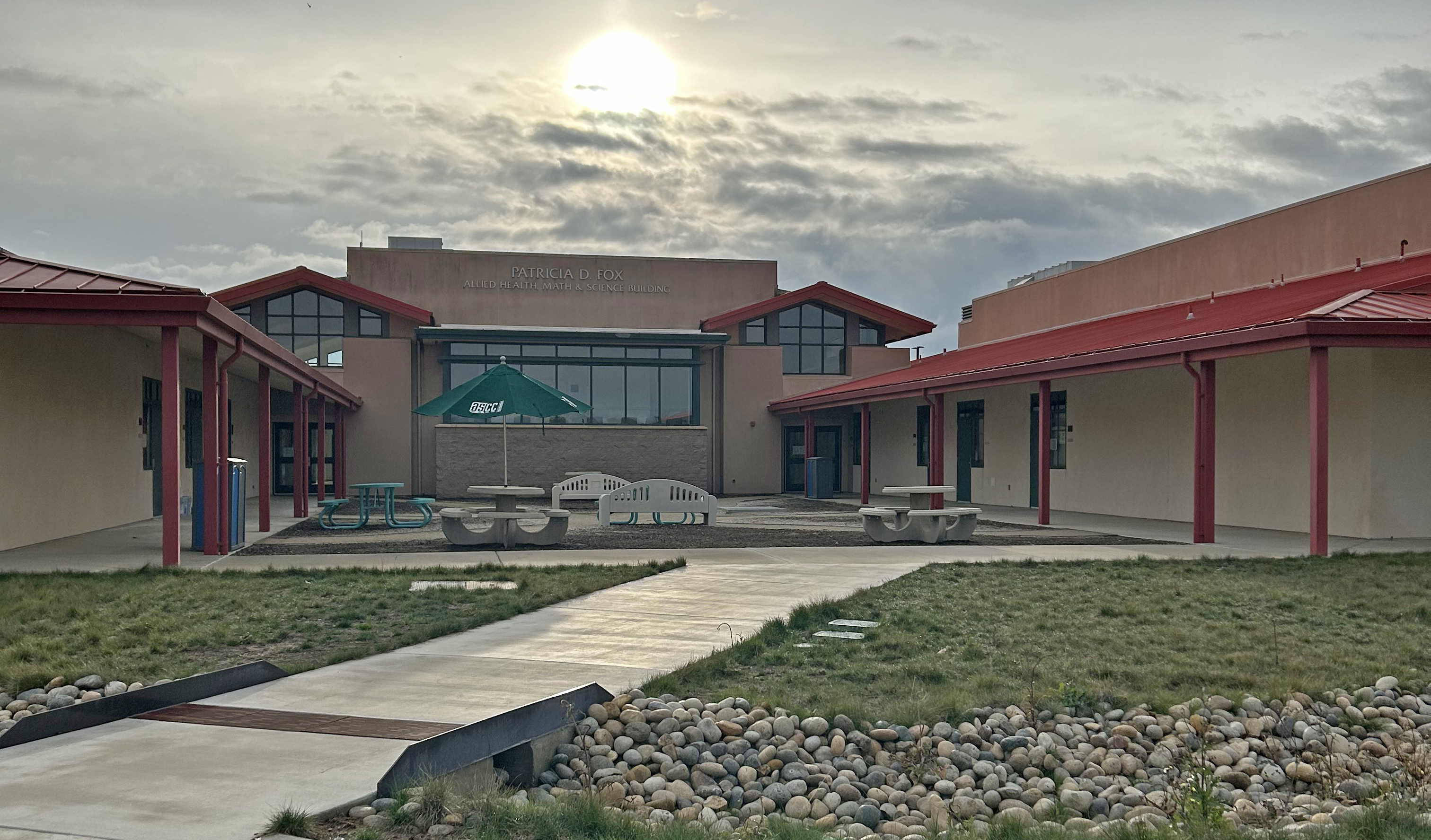
The Patricia D. Fox Allied Health, Math & Science Building, shown in 2023, is part of Cuesta College's North County Campus expansion since the original opening in 1998.

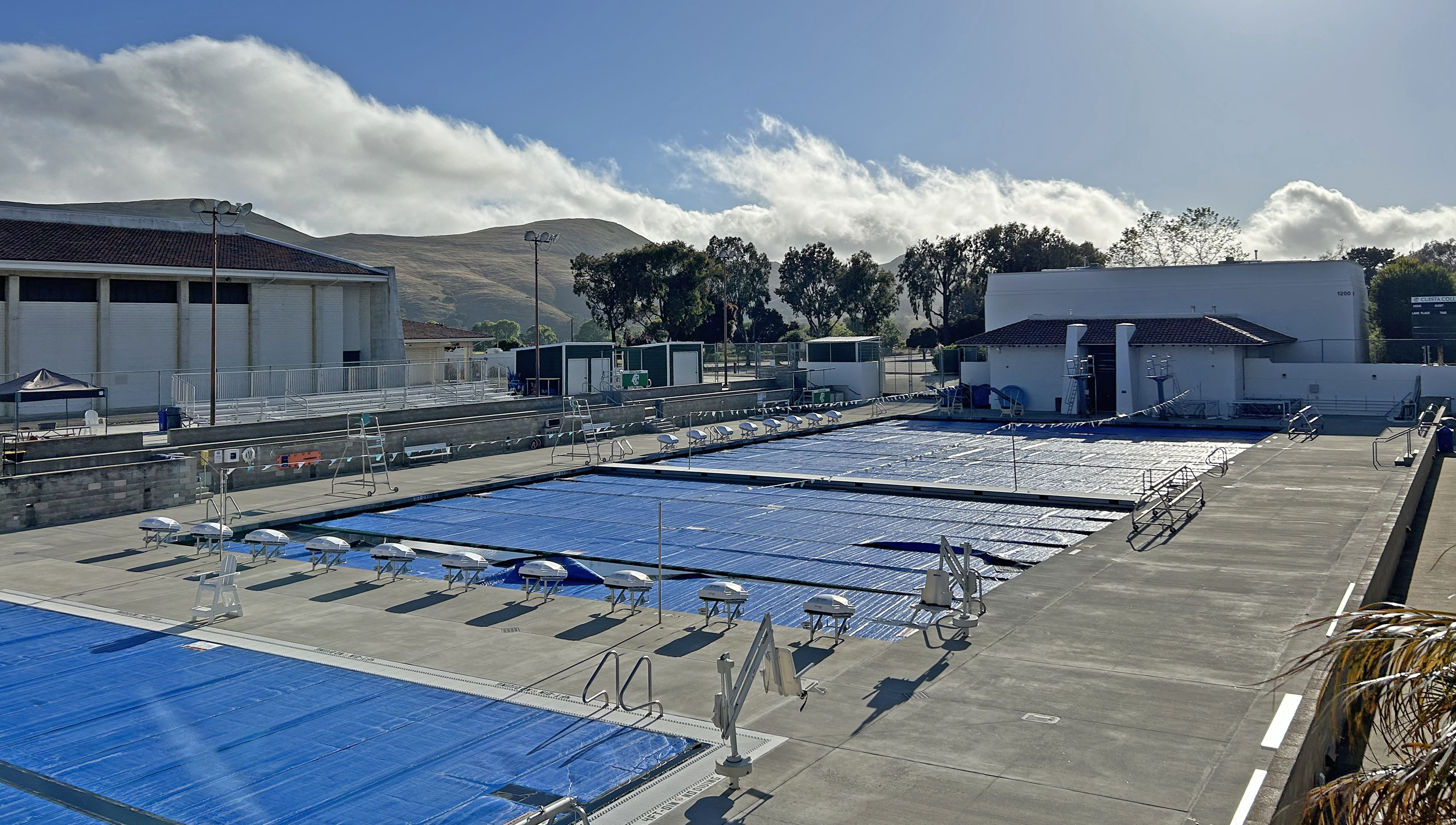
The Cuesta College Aquatics Center is pictured in May 2024.

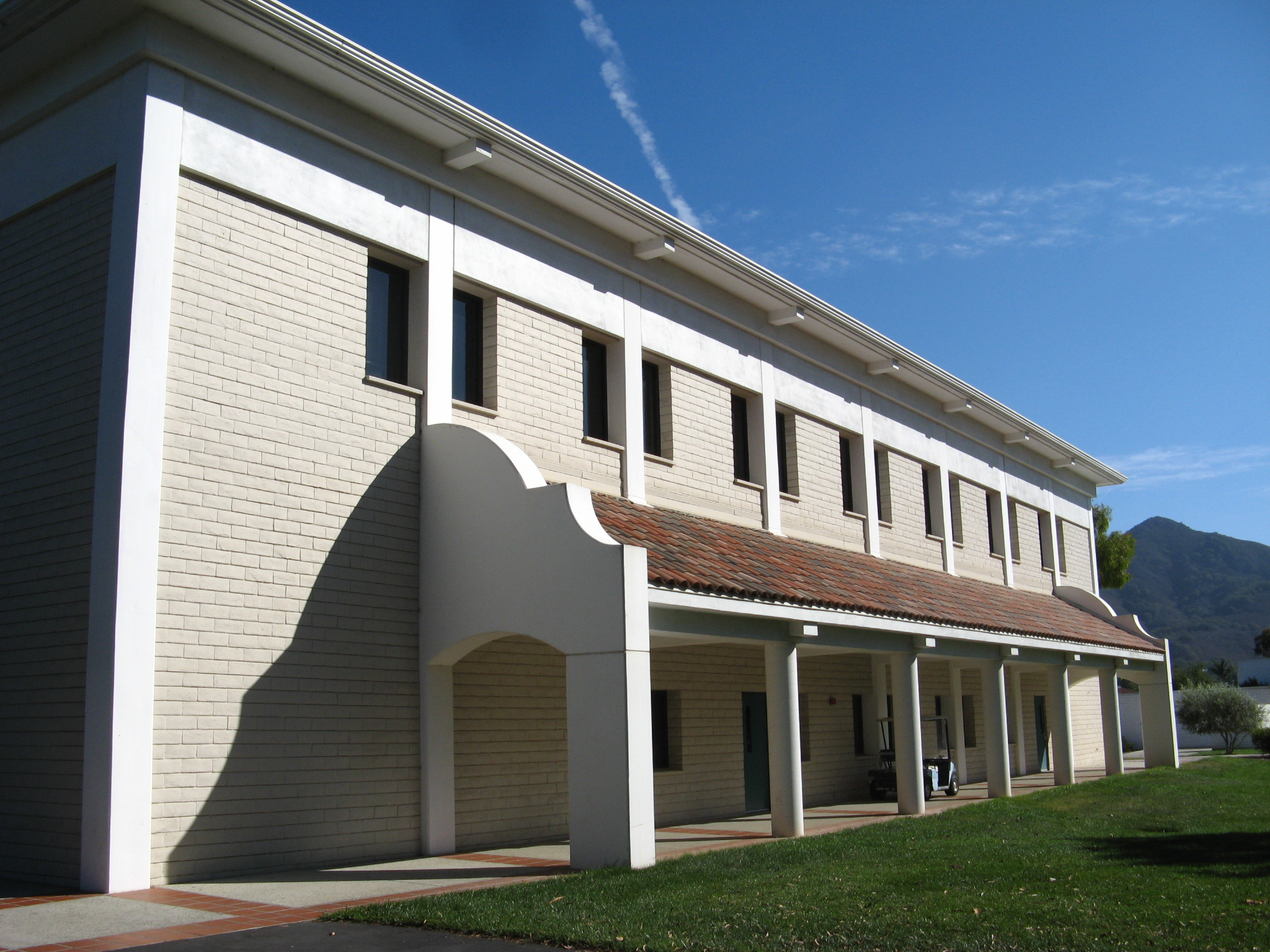
Cuesta College's Building 3100, noted for its modern mission-style design, is pictured at the San Luis Obispo campus.

== Notable people ==
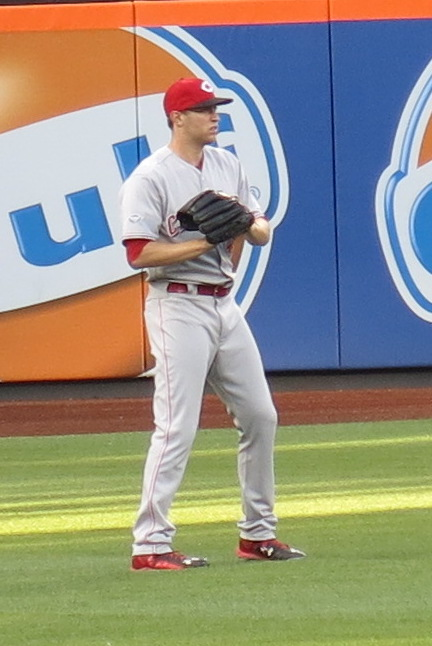
Jon Moscot

- Dave Anthony, comedian
- Jay Asher, writer
- Josimar Ayarza, professional basketball player
- Doug Bernier, professional baseball player
- Sam Blakeslee (born 1955), founding director of the Institute for Advanced Technology & Public Policy at Cal Poly, San Luis Obispo
- Sean Chambers, professional basketball player
- Mangkubumi (born 1972), Crown Princess of the Yogyakarta Sultanate
- Ian McCall, retired mixed martial artist
- Mike Miller, professional baseball player
- Jon Moscot (born 1991), professional baseball player
- Kristof Ongenaet, professional basketball player
- Martin Rajniak, professional basketball player
- Logan Schafer, professional baseball player
- Jake Shields, mixed martial artist
- Robert Van Scoyoc, professional baseball coach
- Paula Zima, artist known for her sculptures, paintings and etchings
