= CSET =

CSET may refer to:

- California Subject Examinations for Teachers
- Center for Security and Emerging Technology
