= Rusty Blair =

American basketball player and coach

Rusty Blair († May 18, 2025) was an American professional basketball player and coach.

== Early life ==
Blair attended San Luis Obispo High School, where he earned the California Interscholastic Federation's Southern Section Division 2A Player of the Year award as a senior in 1967–68.

== College career ==
Blair received recruiting offers from numerous NCAA Division I colleges, ultimately electing to play for Oregon. In February 1970, he gained notoriety for scoring 19 points to help lead the Ducks to a 78–65 upset of then-No. 1-ranked UCLA.

== Professional career ==
Blair was selected by the Memphis Sounds (then the Memphis Pros) in the 1972 ABA Draft, picked in the fifth round.

Standing 6-foot-8, he instead played 11 seasons in Europe (10 in FIBA and one in the World Basketball League), averaging 27.2 points and 10.4 rebounds during his career, much of which was spent with the then-Coveco and Kaypro club (wearing number 10 for the team now known as Basketball Stars Weert).

== Coaching ==
Blair became a professional head coach in April 1988, taking over BSW Miniware Weert in the Holland Professional Basketball League, and served as the coach for the South Team in the 1989 DBL All-Star Gala held in Amsterdam.

He was named head coach at Cuesta College in April 1992. Blair announced his retirement following the 2025 season, after leading the Cougars to the CCCAA regional playoffs. With Cuesta, he won eleven championship titles in the Western State Conference. Blair received Western State Conference Coach of the Year honors in 1997, 1998, 2009, 2010, 2012, 2014, 2015 and 2019.

He died on May 18, 2025, at age 74.
