= The "P" (Cal Poly San Luis Obispo) =

University campus landmark

The Cal Poly San Luis Obispo P
- Interactive map of The Cal Poly San Luis Obispo P
- Location: California, United States
- Nearest city: San Luis Obispo
- Coordinates: 35.302798°N 120.65163°W
- Established: 1919

The "P" is a 50-by-30-foot (15 by 9 m) landmark located atop a northwestern hill of California Polytechnic State University, San Luis Obispo, California. Its creation dates back to the early 1900s, and it has remained on the same hillside ever since.

== Origin of the "P" ==
The "P" has been at the university since at least 1919, but its exact origin has been debated.

One story of its birth is that Cal Poly San Luis Obispo's students and administration wanted to present the school to the rest of the community by placing a "P" for Poly on the campus hillside. A lot of thought was put into the idea of whether to use a water tower with a "P" painted on it, or to construct a giant "P". The idea of the "P" on the hillside won because of the expensive costs of purchasing a water tower. It was purposely placed in a spot that could be viewed from three specific locations: the administration building's porch, the newly constructed Highway 101, and the air, as flying was becoming popular.

Another theory of the origin of the "P" is that it was constructed as a result of a rivalry between Cal Poly San Luis Obispo and San Luis Obispo High School. A 1919 issue of the Cal Poly San Luis Obispo student newspaper, The Polygram, states that one morning Poly students awoke to discover large “H’s” (for High) constructed out of stones on the hills surrounding San Luis Obispo. The Poly students changed each “H” to a “P”, and the high school students battled back, again changing the letters. Poly students began to concentrate their defense on a hillside overlooking the campus, where the “P” has graced the hill ever since.

== Construction ==
The first recorded “P” to adorn the hillside was made simply of whitewashed stones. This was problematic because the wind and rain would wash the stones away. The stones also made it easy for the high school students to change the “P” to an “H”. Under the supervision of the sophomores, the freshmen dorm boys maintained the 24-by-40-foot (7 by 12 m) “P”, tidying up its stone outline and refilling it when needed.

Our class this year has quite a few young boys [who] are small in stature, but not in willpower. We held our own in the lining of … the Block P on the hill. Hauling the lime up the hill is no joke, but we didn't balk, just went right on hauling and lining. Maybe we are little, but we'll grow up some day and make mighty Seniors.

— 1928 El Rodeo

The second “P” was constructed out of old, whitewashed barn doors by the Block “P” club. Again, this “P” was short-lived due to high school students who lit it on fire. Until plans were complete to build a concrete “P” on the hill, the letter was reconstructed from wood.

The concrete “P” was also built by the Block “P” club and was overseen by then student body president, Harry Wineroth. The new “P” was 40 feet (12 m) tall and 30 feet (9 m) wide, much larger than its predecessors.

By 1956 the “P” was in shambles and in desperate need of repair. The social fraternity, Delta Sigma Phi and a group of agricultural engineering students stepped in to help build a long-lasting “P”. On May 3, 1957, the two groups finished construction on the new “P”. This is the same “P” that can be seen on the campus hillside today.

== Maintenance Traditions ==
It was decided that the maintenance of the “P” would lie in the hands of the freshman and sophomore classes in the form of a contest dubbed “The Freshman Sophomore Brawl”. The contest featured events such as tug-of-war, three-legged races and talent shows. The loser of the two classes would be the ones to maintain the structure. The sophomores usually won, leaving the “P” in the hands of the freshmen.

The “P” was a perfect target for school rivals to attack. Cal Poly San Luis Obispo's biggest rivalry was Fresno State. Each year, on the night before the big football game, Fresno State students would climb up to the “P” and change it to an “F”. In response, freshman began to have bonfires outside of their dormitories and take shifts guarding the “P”. There were even rumors that one year Poly students placed explosives around the “P” to keep it safe.

One Friday night hours after the lights were out … there were rumors … that the school we were playing on Saturday was going to deface the P. While trying to wake another friend, I was met by Captain Deuel [the dorm monitor]. He shone his flash[light] in my face and wanted to know what was going on … half the dorm was AWOL. When I told him … he said, Wake your friends and get up there … but spread the word — Don't step one foot off the campus.

— Don Fulwider, class of 1925

As the campus population grew, “The Brawl” became less popular. As a result, a spirit organization, The Rally Club, formed in 1957 to maintain the “P”. On the day before a football game, the club would carry a generator up the trail to the “P” and light the monument. If Poly won the game, the following night the Rally Club would replace the “P” with a “V” for victory. This tradition continued up until the late 1970s, when interest dropped and the club ended.

For about 13 years the “P” sat on the hill with no steady caretakers. Weathering and vandalism began to take its toll on the “P”, causing it to slowly decay. Many claimed that the “P” was a nuisance and an eyesore, and a petition to get rid of the “P” circulated. The petition received more than 1000 signatures, stirring a debate among students and alumni. Hostility against the “P” escalated as the school was unable to deter the vandalism.

In 1994 a spirit organization, Running Thunder, was formed to take care of the “P” and to promote school pride. They cleaned, painted, and lit the “P”. The club, now called the Mustang Maniacs, continues to take care of the “P” and paint it about three times every year. Clubs are permitted to paint the "P" provided they obtain permission from the Mustang Maniacs and repaint it to its standard white within a reasonable time.

The "P" has started sliding down the slope of the hill and is suffering from some stress fractures due to the movement.

== Controversy ==
Decorating the “P” and using it to spread messages is a long-standing campus tradition. In 1964, the “P” was transformed into “GOP”. In the 1970s, it was changed to “POT”. In the 1980s, “SPRINGSTEEN” appeared on the hillside. The “P” has been formed into the Greek letters of the sororities and fraternities on campus. Even marriage proposals have been spelled out using the “P”.

Throughout its history, the “P” has been painted numerous times as well. In a response to the Sept. 11 terrorist attacks, the campus painted the concrete letter with the stars and stripes of the American flag. For bicentennial, it was painted red, white, and blue. It has been painted with hearts for Valentine's Day and red and green for Christmas. Zebra stripes have even been painted across its face.

The Gays, Lesbians, Bisexuals United and Pride Alliance Center painted it like a rainbow during commUNITY pride week. Immediately, a group of 15 to 20 students were caught with “John Deere green” paint trying to cover up the rainbow. The Gays, Lesbians, Bisexuals United and Pride Alliance Center painted another rainbow over the green, yet students continued to paint over it. It became an ongoing cycle that triggered debate. The gay activists received permission to paint the "P" rainbow from the Cal Poly San Luis Obispo Mustang booster club, the Running Thunder club, and the keepers of the concrete “P”. The students who painted over the rainbow did not get permission to do so.

"It's so much more than a prank. They want to shut us up.” -Mike Sullivan, a computer engineering major and former president of Gays, Lesbians and Bisexuals United

As the controversy around the rainbow grew, minority students and professors held a march to protest Cal Poly San Luis Obispo's lack of diversity and tolerance.

== Bishop Peak "P" ==
In addition to the "Poly P" described above, there is another, less famous "P" on the face of Bishop Peak, facing the original "P", and still visible in 2022. According to a typewritten document held in university Archives, a former student named Walt Lumley recalls painting the Bishop Peak "P" in 1926 using ten gallons of white lead paint, a rope, and several volunteer assistants, one with a megaphone. He reports that the "P" was repainted 28 years later.
