= Brooks Lee =

American baseball player (born 2001)

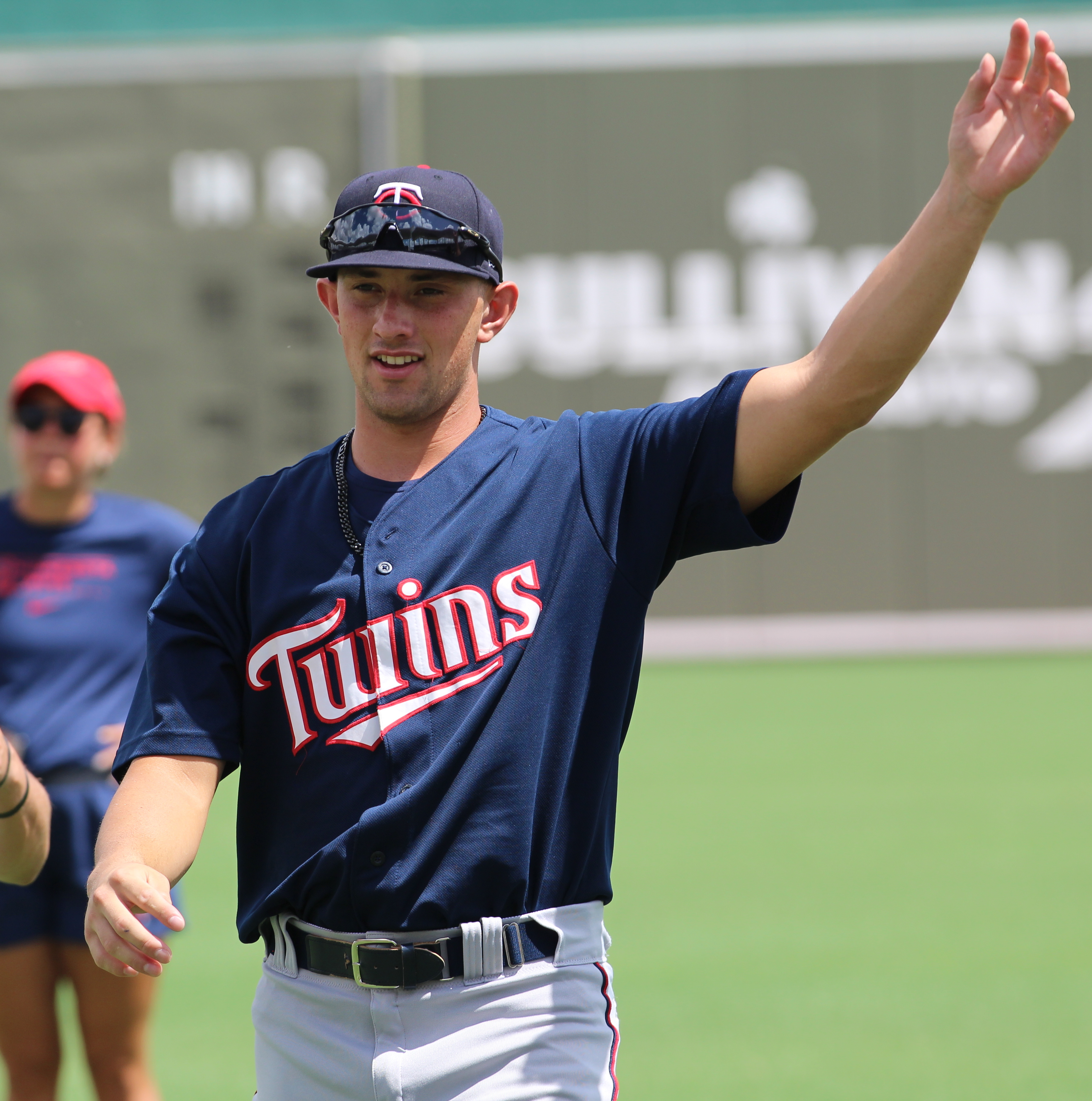
- Lee with the Minnesota Twins in 2022

Minnesota Twins – No. 22
- Shortstop / Third baseman
- Born: February 14, 2001 (age 25); San Luis Obispo, California, U.S.
- Bats: Switch Throws: Right

MLB debut
- July 3, 2024, for the Minnesota Twins

MLB statistics (through 2026 season)
- Batting average: .242
- Home runs: 43
- Runs batted in: 174
- Stats at Baseball Reference

Teams
- Minnesota Twins (2024–present)

Brooks Thomas Lee (born February 14, 2001) is an American professional baseball shortstop and third baseman for the Minnesota Twins of Major League Baseball (MLB).

Born and raised in San Luis Obispo, California, Lee played college baseball at Cal Poly. He was selected by the Twins in the first round of the 2022 Major League Baseball draft. He made his MLB debut in 2024.

== Amateur career ==
Lee attended San Luis Obispo High School in San Luis Obispo, California. He batted .438 his freshman season and as a junior, he hit .462. As a senior in 2019, he batted .405 with 13 doubles and 25 runs batted in (RBI) over 23 games. He was considered a top prospect for the 2019 Major League Baseball draft but withdrew his name the day before, telling teams he would fulfill his commitment to attend California Polytechnic State University, San Luis Obispo to play college baseball for the Cal Poly Mustangs. He was still selected by the San Francisco Giants in the 35th round as a courtesy pick. After graduating, he spent the summer playing in the West Coast League for the Corvallis Knights and was named the league's top prospect after hitting .333 with three home runs, 35 RBI and 12 stolen bases over 43 games.

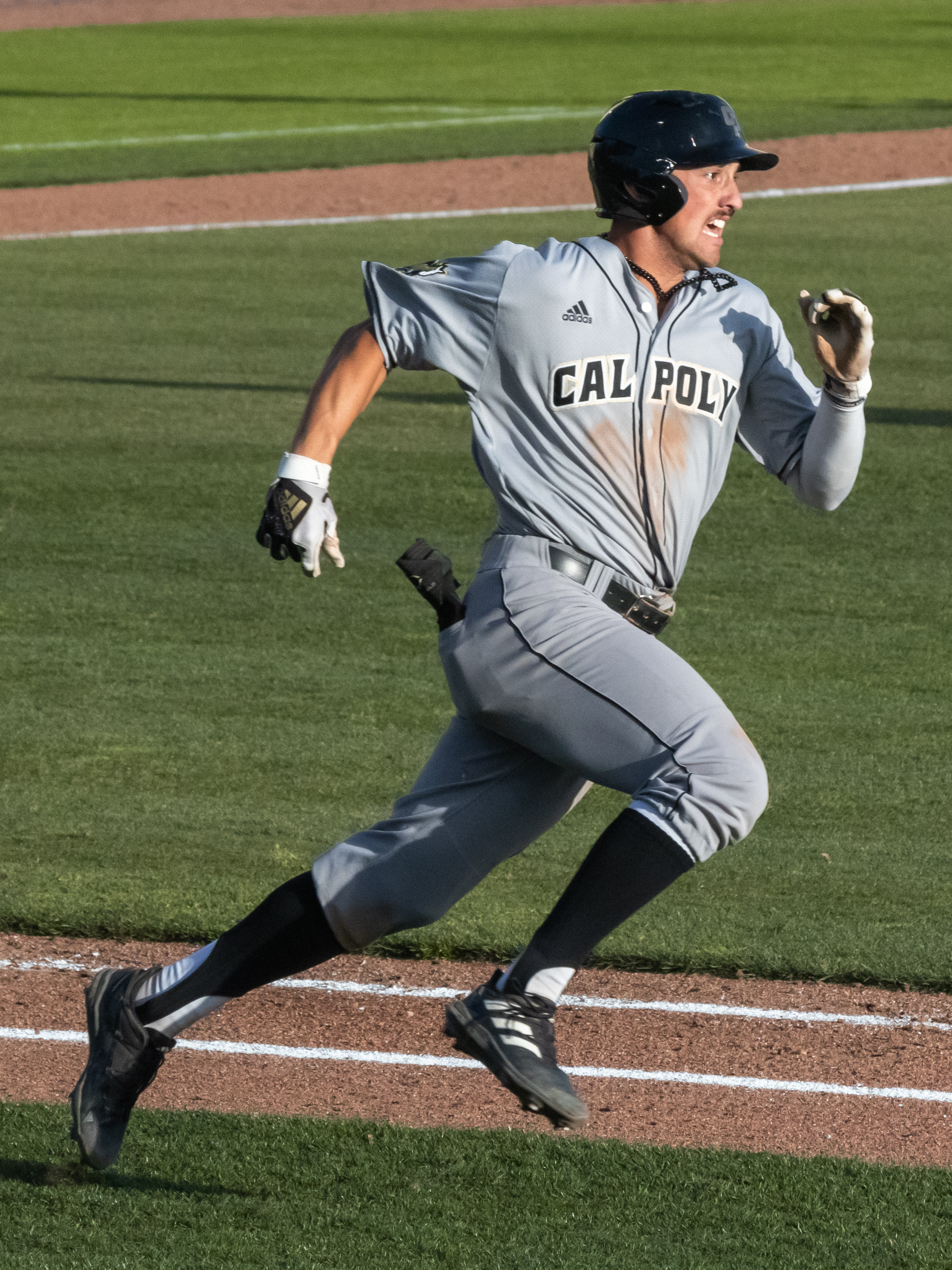
Lee with Cal Poly in 2022

During the first semester of Lee's freshman year, he hyperextended his knee and underwent surgery. He missed the beginning of the 2020 season due to recovery and appeared in only two games before the college baseball season was cancelled due to the COVID-19 pandemic. That summer, he played in the Northwoods League for the Willmar Stingers. In 2021, as a redshirt freshman, Lee played in 55 games in which he slashed .342/.411/.626 with ten home runs, 57 RBI, and 27 doubles (a Cal Poly record). He committed a total of six errors over the course of the season for a .974 fielding percentage. He made All-American by various media outlets and was named the Big West Conference Co-Field Player of the Year as well as the Big West Conference Co-Freshman Field Player of the Year. He was also a finalist for the Brooks Wallace Award. Following the season's end, he spent time playing in the Cape Cod Baseball League for the Yarmouth–Dennis Red Sox. Over 21 games, he batted .405/.432/.667 with six home runs. He was also named to the USA Baseball Collegiate National Team with whom he spent part of the summer.

Lee entered the 2022 season as a top prospect for the upcoming draft. Over 58 games, Lee batted .357/.462/.664 with 15 home runs, 55 RBI and 25 doubles and was named Big West Field Player of the Year for the second straight season. He also won the Brooks Wallace Award as the best collegiate shortstop. Following the season's end, he traveled to San Diego where he participated in the Draft Combine.

== Professional career ==
=== Minor leagues ===
The Minnesota Twins selected Lee in the first round with the eighth overall selection of the 2022 Major League Baseball draft. He signed with the team for $5.6 million.

Lee made his professional debut in 2022 after signing with the Rookie-level Florida Complex League Twins and was promoted to the Cedar Rapids Kernels of the High-A Midwest League after four games. After 25 games with Cedar Rapids, he was promoted to the Wichita Wind Surge of the Double-A Texas League. Over 31 games between the three teams, he slashed .303/.388/.451 with five home runs and 15 RBI. To open the 2023 season, Lee returned to Wichita. In early August, he was promoted to the St. Paul Saints of the Triple-A International League. Over 125 games between the two teams, Lee slashed .275/.347/.461 with 16 home runs, 84 RBI, and 39 doubles. He was assigned back to St. Paul to open the 2024 season. He missed the beginning of the season due to a back injury. With St. Paul, Lee played in 25 games and hit .308 with eight home runs and 25 RBI.

=== Major leagues ===
On July 3, 2024, the Twins selected Lee's contract and promoted him to the major leagues. He made his MLB debut that night as the team's starting shortstop versus the Detroit Tigers and recorded his first career MLB hit, a single off Keider Montero, in the fourth inning. He finished the game 2-for-4 with an RBI. Lee hit his first MLB home run on July 6, a two run home run, off Hunter Brown of the Houston Astros. He spent the remainder of the season with Minnesota, but missed time after going on the injured list with right biceps tendinitis. Over fifty games with the Twins, Lee hit .221 with three home runs and 27 RBI.

Lee opened the 2025 season on the injured list with back tightness and a lumbar strain. After rehabilitating with the Fort Myers Miracle and St. Paul, he was reinstated back to the Twins active roster on April 13. On August 17, Lee hit his first career grand slam off Chris Paddack of the Tigers. Lee played in 139 games for the Twins and hit .236 with 16 home runs, 64 RBI, and 15 doubles.

During the 2026 season, the Twins began using Lee as a third baseman. He played in 156 games and batted .253 with 24 home runs, 83 RBI, and 25 doubles. After the season, Lee was named a finalist for the Gold Glove Award for American League third basemen.

== Personal life ==
Lee's father, Larry, is the head baseball coach at Cal Poly. He is named after Brooks Robinson.
