= Paula Zima =

American artist (born 1953)

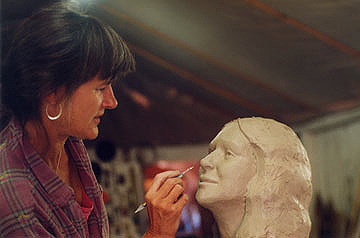
- Born: 1953 (age 72–73); Pasadena, California, U.S.
- Education: Stephens College; California Polytechnic State University, San Luis Obispo (BA); Los Llanos School of Arts and Crafts
- Known for: Sculpture, painting, drawing, printmaking
- Website: paulazima.com

Paula Zima (born 1953) is an American artist. She is known for her sculptures, and paintings, and is celebrated for her artwork of animals. Zima was born in Pasadena, California, and lived in Washington, the San Francisco Bay Area and Central Coast of California, before settling in New Mexico near Santa Fe.

== Early life and education ==
Paula Zima was born in 1953, in Pasadena, California. She attended high school in Northern California.

Zima studied field biology at Stephens College in Columbia, Missouri in the early 1970s, and she graduated in 1979 with a BA degree in graphic communication from California Polytechnic State University, San Luis Obispo. She also attended Los Llanos School of Arts and Crafts in Santa Fe, New Mexico, and Cuesta College in San Luis Obispo, California.

== Artwork ==
Zima's sculpture has been influenced mainly by artists Beni Bufano, Marino Marini, Gustav Vigeland and Allan Houser.

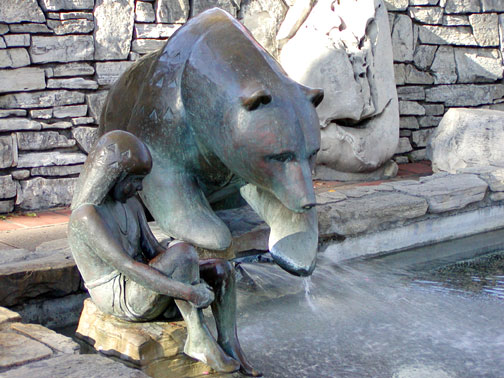
Tequski' wa Suwa (1988)

Zima's life-size bronze sculpture group, "Tequski' wa Suwa", was installed September 1988 in front of the Mission San Luis Obispo de Tolosa in San Luis Obispo, California. The artist commented at the time that "My intention in creating the piece is to honor the two major life forms of the region, before the influx of the European culture, the indigenous Chumash people and the Grizzly Bear." "Tequski' wa suwa" is a Chumash phrase, in the dialect of the people who lived where the mission now is, and translates to "bear and child". Funds for the sculpture were provided by the Stanley P. Von Stein memorial trust, and the Mary Jane Duval memorial trust . The work was surveyed by the Save Outdoor Sculpture! initiative in 1994 and was deemed to be "Well maintained."

Other public works include two "Greeting Bears" which are two life-sized concrete castings of a grizzly bear, placed at each of the two bridges that lead to the town of Los Osos, California. The castings were later painted by the artist.

Her sculpture Otter Touching Its Tail, located in Santa Cruz, California is work in which "an abstract otter forms a doughnut by touching its tail and hind feet with its head and front feet. There is triangular embossing along the otter's sides that may represent a wave motif." Zima's Meditation Bird is located at Sierra Vista Hospital in San Luis Obispo, California.

Zima has illustrated holiday gift boxes for See's Candies.
