= Cal Poly Mustangs baseball =

Cal Poly Mustangs
- 2026 Cal Poly Mustangs baseball team
- Founded: 1948
- University: California Polytechnic State University, San Luis Obispo
- Head coach: Larry Lee (24th season)
- Conference: Big West
- Location: San Luis Obispo, California
- Home stadium: Baggett Stadium (capacity: 3,138)
- Nickname: Mustangs
- Colors: Poly green, copper gold, and stadium gold

NCAA regional champions
- 2026

NCAA tournament appearances
- 2009, 2013, 2014, 2025, 2026

Conference tournament champions
- 2025, 2026

Conference regular season champions
- 2014, 2026

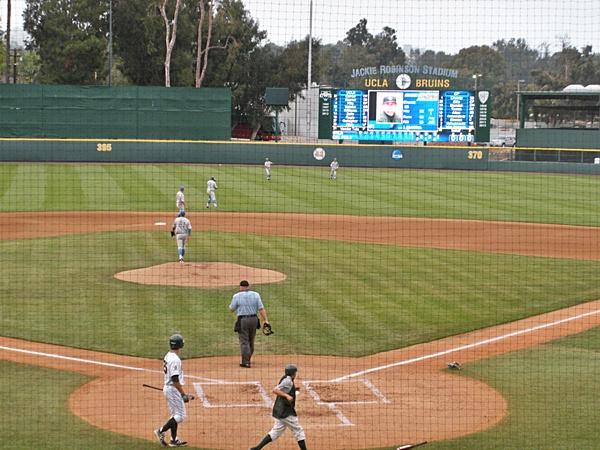
Cal Poly vs. the UCLA Bruins at the L.A. Regional at Jackie Robinson Stadium on June 1, 2013

The Cal Poly Mustangs baseball team represents California Polytechnic State University, which is located in San Luis Obispo, California. The Mustangs are an NCAA Division I college baseball program, and along with the other Cal Poly athletic teams with the exception of swimming, wrestling, indoor track and football, the baseball team competes in the Big West Conference.

The Cal Poly Mustangs play all home games on campus at Robin Baggett Stadium. Under the direction of Head Coach Larry Lee, the Mustangs have played in three NCAA tournaments—2009, 2013, and 2014—including hosting their first regional in 2014. The Mustangs also won their first Big West Conference title in 2014.

Prior to Lee's arrival and Cal Poly's move to Division I in all sports, the Mustangs played in multiple Division II regionals. Cal Poly initially won an NCAA Division II championship in 1989, although it was later vacated by the NCAA.

== Conference membership history ==
- 1948–1994: CCAA
- 1995–1996: Western Athletic Conference
- 1997–present: Big West Conference

== The Blue-Green Rivalry ==
The main rival of the Cal Poly is UC Santa Barbara. The rivalry is a part of the larger Blue–Green Rivalry, which encompasses all sports between the two schools.

== Baggett Stadium ==
Baggett Stadium is a baseball stadium on the Cal Poly campus in San Luis Obispo, California. It was opened on January 21, 2001, with a 6–5 victory over Stanford in 12 innings. After renovations and expansion in 2018, it now seats 3,138. A record attendance of 3,284 was set on May 6, 2005, during a game against Cal State Fullerton.

== Head coaches (Division I era) ==
Tenure	Coach	Years	Record	Pct.
1995–2002	Ritch Price	8	217–228–1	.488
2003–present	Larry Lee	22	713–552–2	.564
Totals	2 coaches	30 seasons	930–780–3	.544

== Year-by-year NCAA Division I results ==
Record table
Season	Coach	Overall	Conference	Standing	Postseason
Western Athletic Conference (1995–1996)
1995	Ritch Price	21–29	13–17	5th (Western)	
1996	Ritch Price	30–23	18–12	3rd (Western)	
Big West Conference (1997–present)
1997	Ritch Price	37–21	15–15	T–3rd (South)	BWC tournament (1–2)
1998	Ritch Price	16–42	7–21	4th (South)	
1999	Ritch Price	21–34	9–21	6th	
2000	Ritch Price	32–24	18–12	T–3rd	
2001	Ritch Price	30–26	8–10	5th	
2002	Ritch Price	30–29–1	15–9	3rd	
2003	Larry Lee	27–28–1	9–12	4th	
2004	Larry Lee	38–23–1	10–11	T–4th	
2005	Larry Lee	36–20	14–7	T–2nd	
2006	Larry Lee	29–27	10–11	4th	
2007	Larry Lee	32–24	13–8	4th	
2008	Larry Lee	24–32	8–16	T–7th	
2009	Larry Lee	37–21	14–10	3rd	NCAA Tempe Regional (0–2)
2010	Larry Lee	23–32	10–14	5th	
2011	Larry Lee	27–26	15–9	3rd	
2012	Larry Lee	36–20	16–8	2nd	
2013	Larry Lee	40–19	17–10	2nd	NCAA Los Angeles Regional (1–2)
2014	Larry Lee	47–12	19–5	1st	NCAA San Luis Obispo Regional (2–2)
2015	Larry Lee	27–27	14–10	4th	
2016	Larry Lee	32–25	12–12	4th	
2017	Larry Lee	28–28	16–8	2nd	
2018	Larry Lee	30–27	15–9	2nd	
2019	Larry Lee	28–28	17–7	T–2nd	
2020*	Larry Lee	5–11	0–0	N/A	
2021	Larry Lee	31–25	21–19	4th	
2022	Larry Lee	37–21	22–8	2nd	
2023	Larry Lee	21-35	11-19	8th	
2024	Larry Lee	35-22	20-10	4th	
2025	Larry Lee	43-19	23-7	2nd	NCAA Eugene Regional (2–2)
2026	Larry Lee	39–24	22-8	T–1st	NCAA Morgantown Super Regional (3–2)
Total:		969–804–3	451–355		
National champion Postseason invitational champion Conference regular season champion Conference regular season and conference tournament champion Division regular season champion Division regular season and conference tournament champion Conference tournament champion

== NCAA tournament History ==
- The NCAA Division I baseball tournament started in 1947.
- The format of the tournament has changed through the years.
- Cal Poly began playing Division I baseball in 1995.

Year	Record	Pct	Notes
2009	0–2	.000	Eliminated at 49th by Kent State in Tempe Regional
2013	1–2	.333	Eliminated at 33rd by UCLA in Los Angeles Regional
2014	2–2	.500	Eliminated at 17th by Pepperdine in San Luis Obispo Regional
2025	2–2	.500	Eliminated at 17th by Arizona in Eugene Regional
2026	3–2	.600	Eliminated at 9th by West Virginia in Morgantown Super Regional
TOTALS	8–10	.444	

Year	Round	Opponent	Result
2009	Tempe Regional	Oral Roberts	L 3–13
2009	Tempe Regional	Kent State	L 9–10
2013	Los Angeles Regional	San Diego	W 9–2
2013	Los Angeles Regional	UCLA	L 4–6
2013	Los Angeles Regional	San Diego	L 5–8
2014	San Luis Obispo Regional	Sacramento State	W 4–2
2014	San Luis Obispo Regional	Pepperdine	L 1–2
2014	San Luis Obispo Regional	Sacramento State	W 6–5
2014	San Luis Obispo Regional	Pepperdine	L 6–10
2025	Eugene Regional	Arizona	L 2–3
2025	Eugene Regional	Oregon	W 10–8
2025	Eugene Regional	Utah Valley	W 7–6
2025	Eugene Regional	Arizona	L 0–14
2026	Los Angeles Regional	Virginia Tech	W 6–2
2026	Los Angeles Regional	Saint Mary's	W 14–1
2026	Los Angeles Regional	Saint Mary's	W 5-2
2026	Morgantown Super Regional		
2026	Morgantown Super Regional	West Virginia	L 2–12
2026	Morgantown Super Regional	West Virginia	L 1-17

== Awards and honors (Division I only) ==
=== All-Americans ===
Year	Position	Name	Team	Selector
1997	2B	Scott Kidd	2nd	Collegiate Baseball
2005	C	Kyle Blumenthal	3rd	Collegiate Baseball
2005	SP	Garrett Olson	3rd	Collegiate Baseball
2007	OF	Grant Desme	1st	Baseball America
2007	OF	Grant Desme	2nd	Collegiate Baseball
2007	OF	Grant Desme	2nd	NCBWA
2012	OF	Mitch Haniger	2nd	Collegiate Baseball
2014	SP	Matt Imhof	2nd	Collegiate Baseball
2014	SP	Matt Imhof	2nd	NCBWA
2014	SP	Casey Bloomquist	1st	Collegiate Baseball
2014	SP	Casey Bloomquist	2nd	NCBWA
2014	2B	Mark Mathias	2nd	Baseball America
2014	2B	Mark Mathias	3rd	Collegiate Baseball
2014	2B	Mark Mathias	3rd	NCBWA
2017	SP	Spencer Howard	2nd	Collegiate Baseball
2018	OF	Alex McKenna	3rd	Collegiate Baseball
2021	SS	Brooks Lee	1st	Collegiate Baseball
2021	SS	Brooks Lee	1st	D1Baseball.com
2021	SS	Brooks Lee	2nd	Baseball America
2021	SS	Brooks Lee	2nd	ABCA
2022	SS	Brooks Lee	1st	ABCA/Rawlings
2022	SS	Brooks Lee	1st	Collegiate Baseball
2022	SS	Brooks Lee	2nd	D1Baseball.com
2022	SS	Brooks Lee	2nd	Perfect Game
2022	SS	Brooks Lee	2nd	Baseball America
2022	SP	Drew Thorpe	1st	NCBWA
2022	SP	Drew Thorpe	1st	ABCA/Rawlings
2022	SP	Drew Thorpe	1st	D1Baseball.com
2022	SP	Drew Thorpe	1st	Perfect Game
2022	SP	Drew Thorpe	1st	Baseball America
2022	SP	Drew Thorpe	1st	Collegiate Baseball

=== Freshman All-Americans ===
Year	Position	Name	Selector
2009	2B	Matt Jensen	NCBWA
2012	RP	Reed Reilly	Collegiate Baseball
2013	DH	Brian Mundell	Collegiate Baseball
2016	C	Nick Meyer	Collegiate Baseball
2016	SS	Kyle Marinconz	Collegiate Baseball
2017	3B	Bradlee Beesley	Collegiate Baseball
2021	SS	Brooks Lee	Collegiate Baseball
2021	SP	Drew Thorpe	Baseball America
2022	C	Ryan Stafford	Collegiate Baseball
2022	C	Ryan Stafford	Baseball America

=== Big West Field Player of the Year ===
Year	Position	Name
2005	C	Kyle Blumenthal
2007	OF	Grant Desme
2012	OF	Mitch Haniger
2014	2B	Mark Mathias
2018	OF	Alex McKenna
2021	SS	Brooks Lee
2022	SS	Brooks Lee

=== Big West Coach of the Year ===
Year	Name
2014	Larry Lee

Taken from the 2019 Cal Poly baseball media guide. Updated August 17, 2019.

== Mustangs in the Major Leagues ==
= All-Star	= Baseball Hall of Famer

Athlete	Years in MLB	MLB teams
Andrew Alvarez	2025-Present	Washington Nationals
Justin Bruihl	2021-present	Los Angeles Dodgers, Colorado Rockies, Pittsburgh Pirates, Toronto Blue Jays
Kevin Correia	2003–2015	San Francisco Giants, San Diego Padres, Pittsburgh Pirates, Minnesota Twins, Los Angeles Dodgers, Philadelphia Phillies
Casey Fien	2009–2010, 2012–2017	Detroit Tigers, Minnesota Twins, Los Angeles Dodgers, Seattle Mariners, Philadelphia Phillies
Craig Gerber	1985	California Angels
Lee Hancock	1995–1996	Pittsburgh Pirates
Mitch Haniger	2016–2024	Arizona Diamondbacks, Seattle Mariners, San Francisco Giants
Gorman Heimueller	1983–1984	Oakland Athletics
Spencer Howard	2020-2024	Philadelphia Phillies, Texas Rangers, San Francisco Giants, Cleaveland Guardians
Mike Krukow	1976–1989	Chicago Cubs, Philadelphia Phillies, San Francisco Giants
Brooks Lee	2024-Present	Minnesota Twins
Thornton Lee	1933–1948	Cleveland Indians, Chicago White Sox, New York Giants
Mark Mathias	2020-2023	Milwaukee Brewers, Texas Rangers, Pittsburgh Pirates, San Francisco Giants
Mike Miller	2016	Boston Red Sox
Brent Morel	2010–2015	Chicago White Sox, Pittsburgh Pirates
Bud Norris	2009–2018	Houston Astros, Baltimore Orioles, San Diego Padres, Atlanta Braves, Los Angeles Dodgers, Los Angeles Angels, St. Louis Cardinals
Dave Oliver	1977	Cleveland Indians
Garrett Olson	2007–2012	Baltimore Orioles, Seattle Mariners, Pittsburgh Pirates, New York Mets
John Orton	1989–1993	California Angels
Evan Reed	2013–2014	Detroit Tigers
Logan Schafer	2011–2016	Milwaukee Brewers, Minnesota Twins
Ozzie Smith	1978–1996	San Diego Padres, St. Louis Cardinals
Drew Thorpe	2024-Present	Chicago White Sox
Erich Uelmen	2022-2023	Chicago Cubs, Philadelphia Phillies
Bryan Woo	2023-present	Seattle Mariners

== Gallery ==
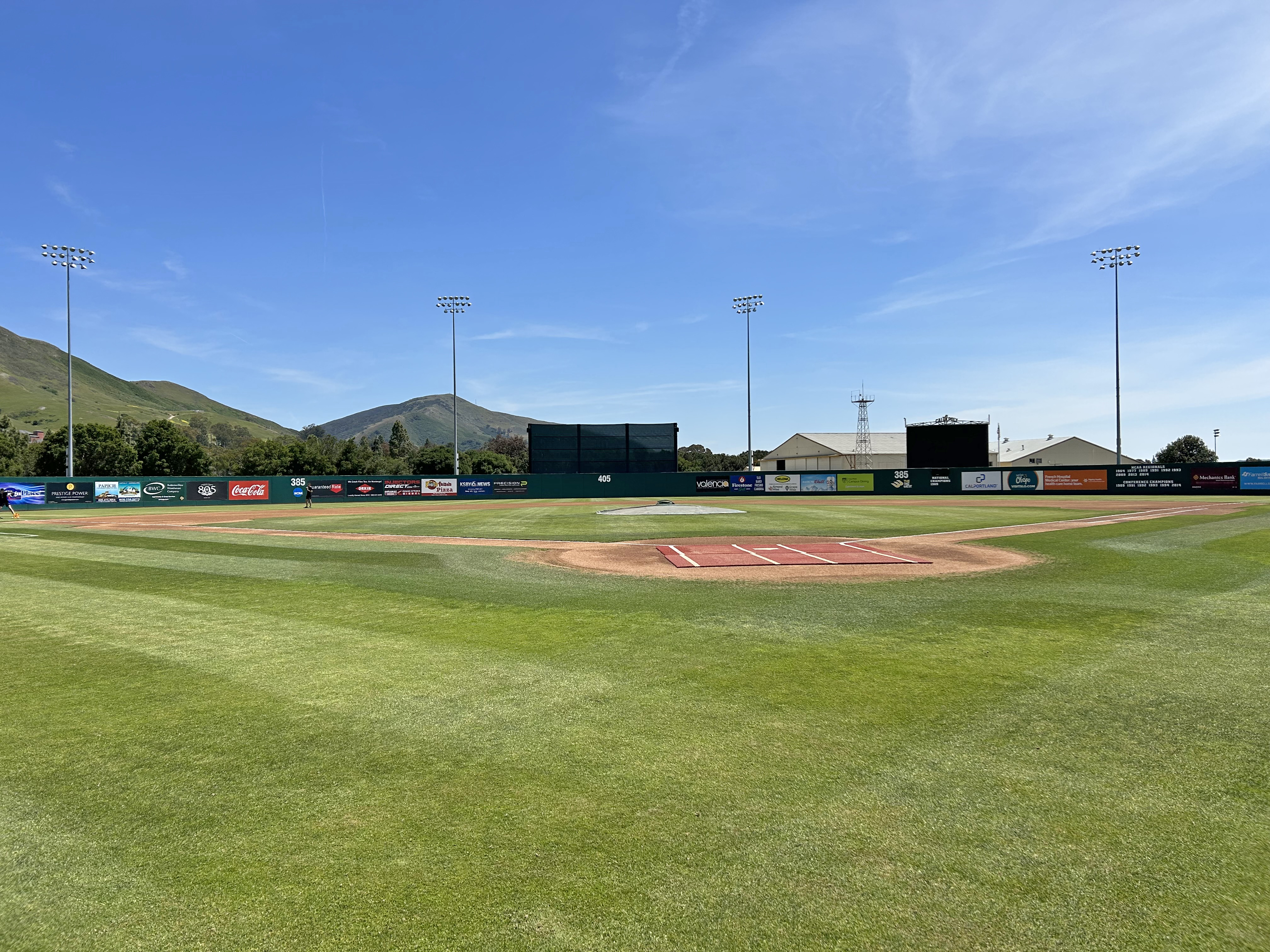
Cal Poly plays its baseball games at Baggett Stadium in San Luis Obispo, Calif., pictured in 2023.

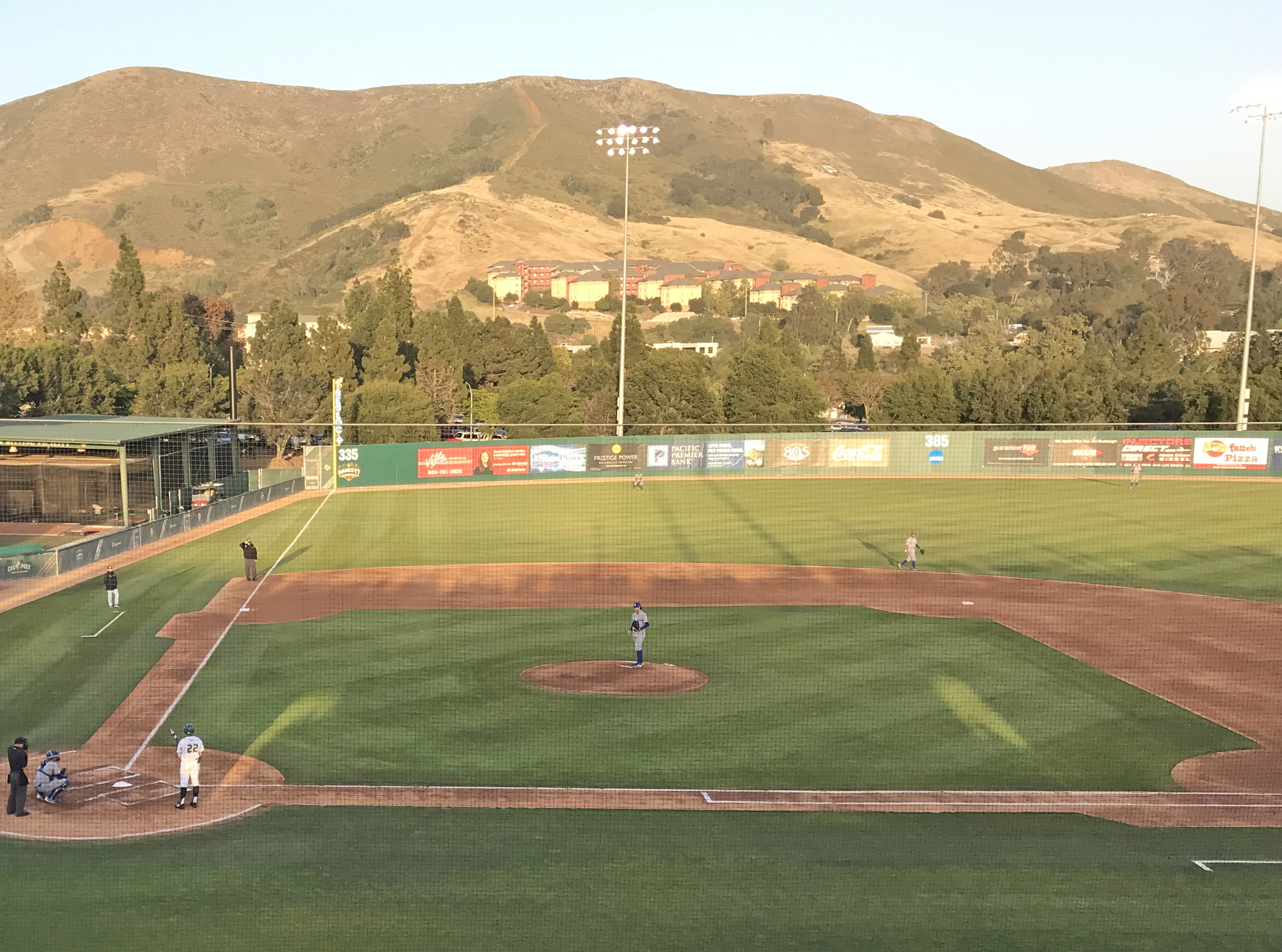
Brooks Lee, then of the Cal Poly baseball team, prepares for an at-bat during an April 2022 game.

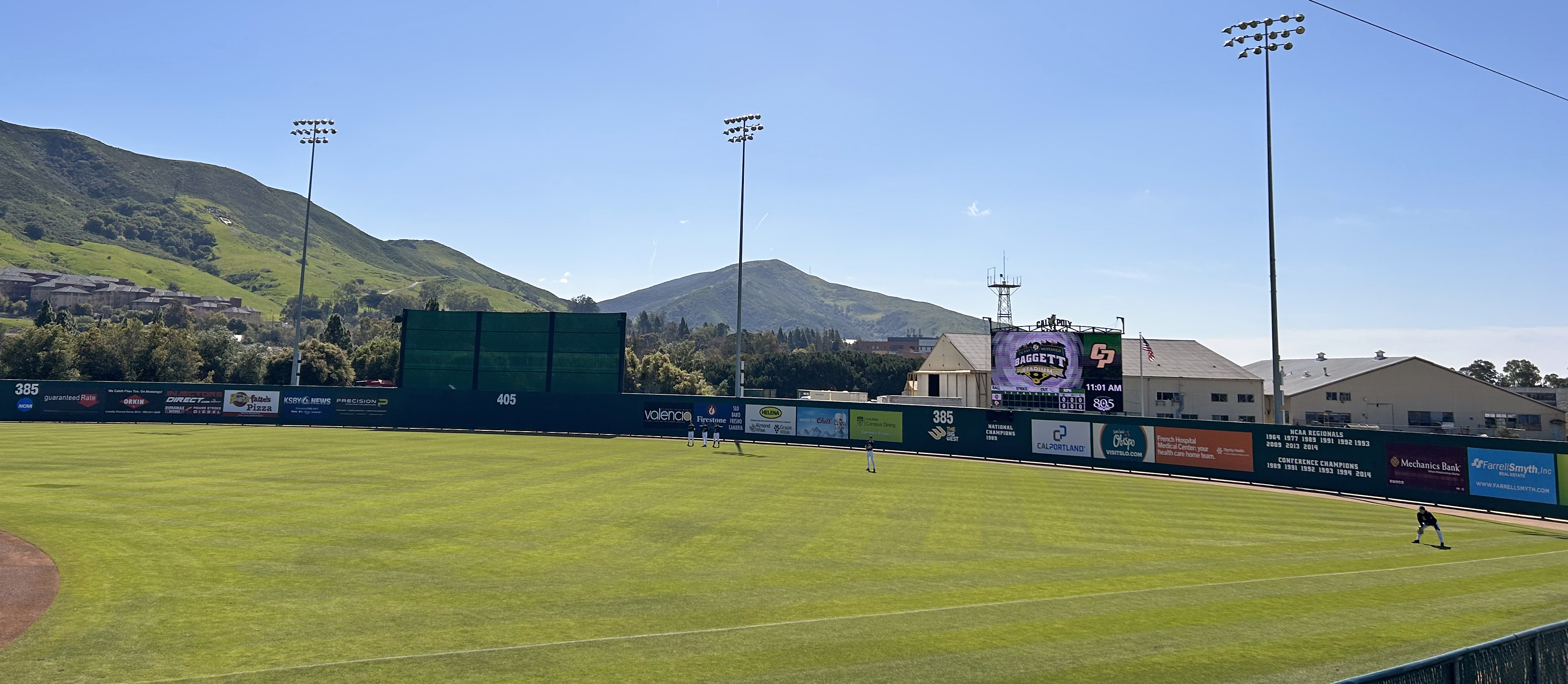
Cal Poly Mustangs baseball players practice in the outfield before a home game during the 2023 season.

== Cal Poly Baseball alumni in the Olympics ==
- Jimmy Van Ostrand (Team Canada), 2008 Beijing
- Joey Wagman (Team Israel), 2020 Tokyo

== Cal Poly Baseball in video games ==
Cal Poly was featured as a playable team in EA's MVP '06: NCAA Baseball game for PlayStation 2 and Xbox.

== See also ==
- List of NCAA Division I baseball programs
