= Gilbert H. Stork =

Gilbert H. Stork is the former president of Cuesta College in San Luis Obispo, California.

A long-time resident of San Luis Obispo, Stork graduated from San Luis Obispo High School and California State Polytechnic University, San Luis Obispo (Cal Poly).

At Cal Poly, he played on the football team, the Mustangs, whose chartered airplane crashed on takeoff on October 29, 1960, in Toledo, Ohio. Eighteen people were killed, and Stork suffered major injuries.

He began his teaching career at San Luis Obispo High School in 1964, then continued his career at Cuesta College as a physical education instructor. He was also a mathematics instructor, associate dean, dean of science and mathematics, and vice president of student services until he retired in 2004. He returned in 2010 to serve as president and retired in 2018.

In September 2016, he received the Louis Tedone, M.D., Humanitarian Award from the French Hospital Medical Center for his "outstanding devotion to education, leadership, and philanthropy."
