= Ritch Price =

American baseball player and coach

Biographical details
- Education: Willamette '78; Cal State–Hayward '87

Playing career
- 1975–1976: Linn–Benton CC
- 1977–1978: Willamette

Coaching career (HC unless noted)
- 1978–1981: Phoenix (OR)
- 1982: Jasper (TX)
- 1983–1986: Menlo College
- 1987–1994: De Anza College
- 1995–2002: Cal Poly
- 2003–2022: Kansas

Head coaching record
- Overall: 798–786–4 (.504)

Ritch Price is an American baseball coach and former player. He played college baseball at Linn–Benton Community College (1975–1976) and Willamette (1977–1978). He then served as the head baseball coach of the Menlo Oaks (1983–1986), the De Anza Dons (1987–1994), the Cal Poly Mustangs (1995–2002) and the Kansas Jayhawks (2003–2022).

== Coaching career ==
Price took over as head coach at Cal Poly for the 1995 season, which was to be the Mustangs first at the Division I level. In his second season, he led the team to a winning record.

He accepted the head coaching position at Kansas on July 2, 2002, and has led the Jayhawks to two NCAA tournament berths and their first Big 12 Conference baseball tournament title in 2006. Kansas had made only two NCAA appearances prior to Price's arrival. Price announced his retirement on May 22, 2022.

== Head coaching record ==
The table below shows Ritch Price's record as a head coach at the Division I level.

Record table
Season	Team	Overall	Conference	Standing	Postseason
Cal Poly Mustangs (Western Athletic Conference) (1995–1996)
1995	Cal Poly	21–29	13–17	5th (West)	
1996	Cal Poly	30–23	18–12	3rd (West)	
Cal Poly:			31–29		
Cal Poly Mustangs (Big West Conference) (1997–2002)
1997	Cal Poly	37–21	15–15	T–3rd (South)	
1998	Cal Poly	16–42	7–21	4th (South)	
1999	Cal Poly	21–34	9–21	6th	
2000	Cal Poly	32–24	18–12	T–3rd	
2001	Cal Poly	30–26	8–10	5th	
2002	Cal Poly	30–29–1	15–9	3rd	
Cal Poly:		217–228–1	72–88		
Kansas Jayhawks (Big 12 Conference) (2003–2022)
2003	Kansas	35–28	9–18	8th	Big 12 tournament
2004	Kansas	31–31–1	7–19	9th	
2005	Kansas	36–28	11–15	7th	Big 12 tournament
2006	Kansas	43–25	13–14	5th	NCAA Regional
2007	Kansas	28–30	9–17	9th	
2008	Kansas	30–27	9–18	9th	
2009	Kansas	39–24	15–12	4th	NCAA Regional
2010	Kansas	31–27–1	11–15–1	7th	Big 12 tournament
2011	Kansas	26–30	9–18	10th	
2012	Kansas	24–34	7–16	7th	Big 12 tournament
2013	Kansas	34–25	12–12	T–6th	Big 12 tournament
2014	Kansas	35–26	15–9	3rd	NCAA Regional
2015	Kansas	23–32	8–15	9th	
2016	Kansas	20–35–1	6–17	9th	
2017	Kansas	30–28	11–13	7th	Big 12 tournament
2018	Kansas	27–30	8–15	8th	Big 12 tournament
2019	Kansas	32–26	12–12	5th	Big 12 tournament
2020	Kansas	7–10	0–0		Season canceled due to COVID-19
2021	Kansas	30–27	8–16	9th	Big 12 tournament
2022	Kansas	20–35	4–20	9th	
Kansas:		581–558–3 (.510)	184–291–1 (.388)		
Total:		798–786–4 (.504)			
National champion Postseason invitational champion Conference regular season champion Conference regular season and conference tournament champion Division regular season champion Division regular season and conference tournament champion Conference tournament champion

== Personal ==
Ritch Price graduated from Sweet Home High School in Sweet Home, Oregon before attending Willamette University. He has three sons, all of whom have played for him at Kansas. His eldest, Ritchie Price, was head coach at South Dakota State from 2008 to 2011, before returning to Kansas to again work on his father's staff. Baseball America believes that the Prices were the first father–son duo to serve as head coach of two Division I programs at the same time.
