= California Subject Examinations for Teachers =

The California Subject Examinations for Teachers, also abbreviated as CSET, is a group of subject matter tests used in California and other states to assess mastery of subject matter content by prospective K-12 teachers. Appropriate subtests of the CSET must be passed before a candidate begins a state-approved teacher preparation program, and satisfies the No Child Left Behind (P.L. 107-110) "highly qualified teacher" requirement.

The tests are administered by National Evaluation Systems, a division of Pearson Education, Inc. Most include both multiple choice and constructed response sections.

The CSET Multiple Subjects Exam is taken by candidates for the multiple subject (elementary education) and Education Specialist (special education) teaching credential. It consists of three subtests. Subtest I covers reading, language, literature, and history; Subtest II covers math and science; Subtest III covers visual and performing arts, physical education, and human development. Subtests may be taken separately or all at once; candidates pay for each subtest separately.

CSET Single Subject Exams are used to assess mastery of specific matter by candidates for the single-subject (secondary) teaching credential. The examination is taken by subject area, such as English or mathematics, and individual tests vary from two to four subtests.

== See also ==
- California Basic Educational Skills Test (CBEST)
