= San Luis Obispo High School =

Public high school in California, United States

Location
- 1499 San Luis Drive; San Luis Obispo, California; United States; 35.2835°N 120.6491°W

Information
- Type: Public secondary
- Motto: Hustle. Grit. Never quit.
- Established: 1895
- School district: San Luis Coastal Unified School District
- NCES School ID: 063480005880
- Principal: Rollin Dickinson
- Faculty: 78
- Teaching staff: 78.00 (FTE)
- Grades: 9 - 12
- Enrollment: 1,650 (2023–2024)
- Student to teacher ratio: 21.15
- Colors: Black and amber
- Fight song: Tiger Rag
- Nickname: Tigers
- Rival: Mission College Preparatory High School, Arroyo Grande High School, Morro Bay High School

San Luis Obispo High School, also referred to as "San Luis High" and "SLO High", is an American public high school in San Luis Obispo, California. It is the only non-continuation public high school within the city. The school is within the San Luis Coastal Unified School District (SLCUSD), serving primarily students living in San Luis Obispo. Before the school's addition of ninth grade in 1982, the school was known as "San Luis Obispo Senior High School" (SLOSH). School colors are black and amber.

== History ==
=== Fire ===
On October 30, 2023, the hill behind SLO High caught fire, 124 acres before it was contained. A 15-year-old boy was arrested for arson during the investigation.

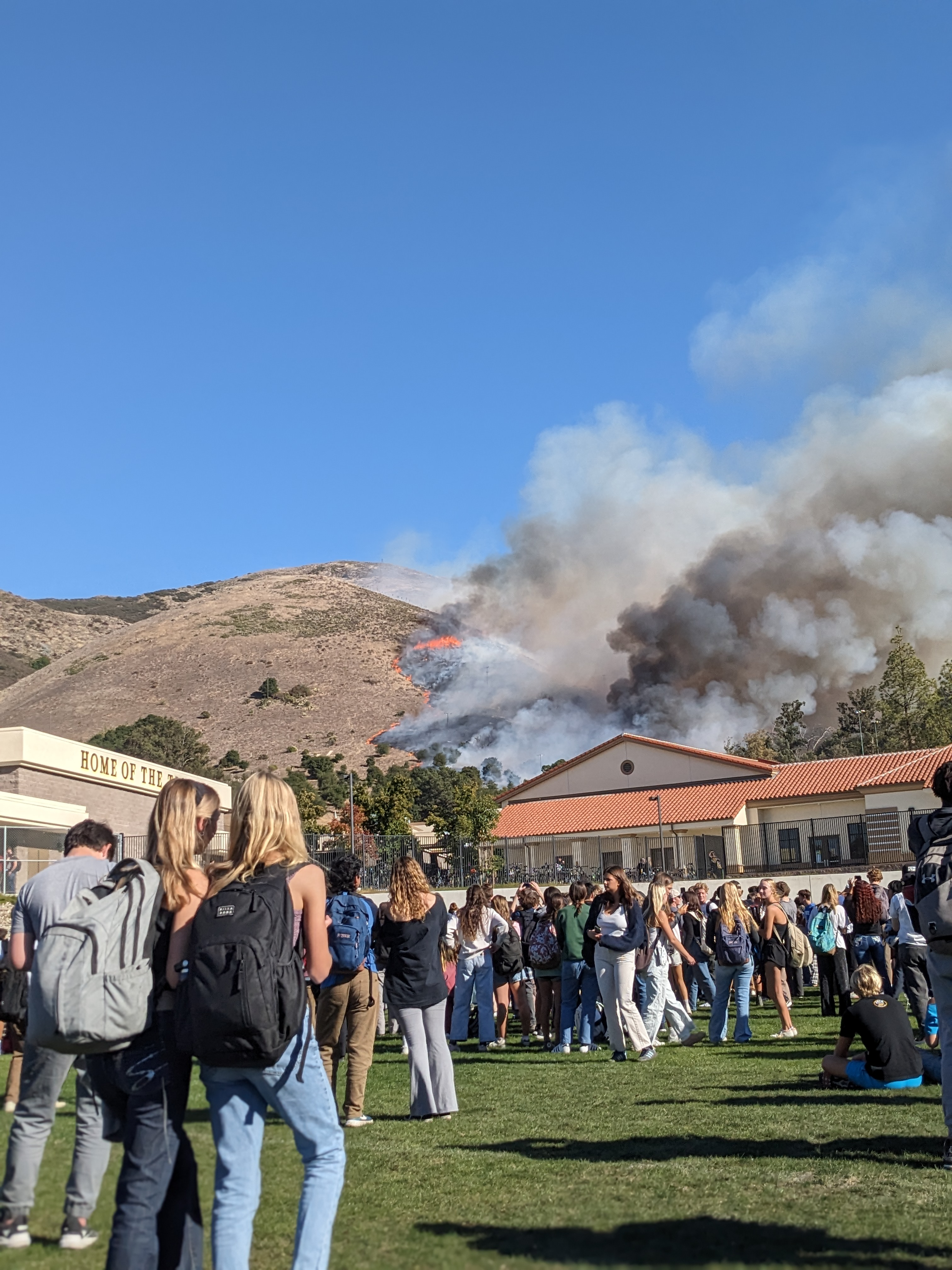
The fire twenty minutes in

== Athletics ==
San Luis Obispo High School is part of the CIF Central Section. The Tigers compete as members of the Central Coast Athletic Association. Athletic offerings include: cross country, football, volleyball, water polo, cheer, basketball, soccer, wrestling, swimming, baseball, golf, tennis, volleyball, stunt, and track & field.

=== CIF Championships ===
- CIF Southern Section Champion Swim Team (boys): 1982 (Div. 2-A), 1985 (2-A), 1986 (2-A), 1989 (2-A), 2005 (Div. II)
- CIF Southern Section Champion Swim Team (girls): 1993 (Div. III)
- CIF Southern Section Football Champions: 1947 (Northern Division), 1960 (Div. A), 1968 (Div. AA), 1980 (Northwestern), 2001 (Div. IV)
- CIF Southern Section Soccer Champions (boys): 1998 (Div. IV)
- CIF Southern Section Soccer Champions (girls): 2016, 2018, 2019, 2020, 2022
- CIF Southern Section Tennis Champions (girls): 1990 (Div. 1-A)
- CIF Southern Section Track & Field Champions (girls): 2008 (Div. III), 2009 (III)
- CIF Southern Section Volleyball Champions (girls): 1989 (Div. 2-A)
- CIF Southern Section Baseball Champions: 1958 (Northern Group), 1959 (3-A), 1990 (4-A), 2000 (Div. IV)
- CIF Southern Section Basketball Champions (boys): 1952 (Northern Group)
- CIF Southern Section Basketball Champions (girls): 1985 (Div. 2-A), 1995 (III-A)
- CIF State Cross Country Champions (boys): 2003 (Div. III) (also SS Div. III champs) / 2021 (Div. 2)
- CIF State Volleyball Champions (girls): 2018 (Div. IV)
- CIF Central Section Cross Country Champions (girls, Division 2) 2018 and 2019
- CIF Central Section Cross Country Champions (boys, Division 1) 2022
- CIF Central Section Track and Field Champions (girls, Division 2) 2022
- CIF Central Section Track and Field Champions (boys, Division 2) 2022

== Notable alumni ==
- Jay Asher, author
- Townsend Bell, auto racing driver
- Ed Brown, professional football
- Katie Burkhart, National Pro Fastpitch Softball
- Dasha, musician
- Double Take, musical duo
- Tim Kubinski, Major League Baseball
- Brooks Lee, Major League Baseball
- Jim Lonborg, Major League Baseball
- Chris Pontius, actor
- Jeff Powers, water polo
- Mel Queen, Major League Baseball
- The Revels, rock band
- Chris Seitz, Major League Soccer
- Gilbert H. Stork, president of Cuesta College
- Paul Sverchek, National Football League
- Jesus Vazquez, Major League Soccer, United Soccer League
