= Yunlin Station =

Yunlin Station can refer to the following stations:

- Yunlin station (Wuxi Metro), a metro station in Wuxi
- Yunlin HSR station, a high speed rail station in Taiwan
