= Télécom Paris =

French university in telecommunication

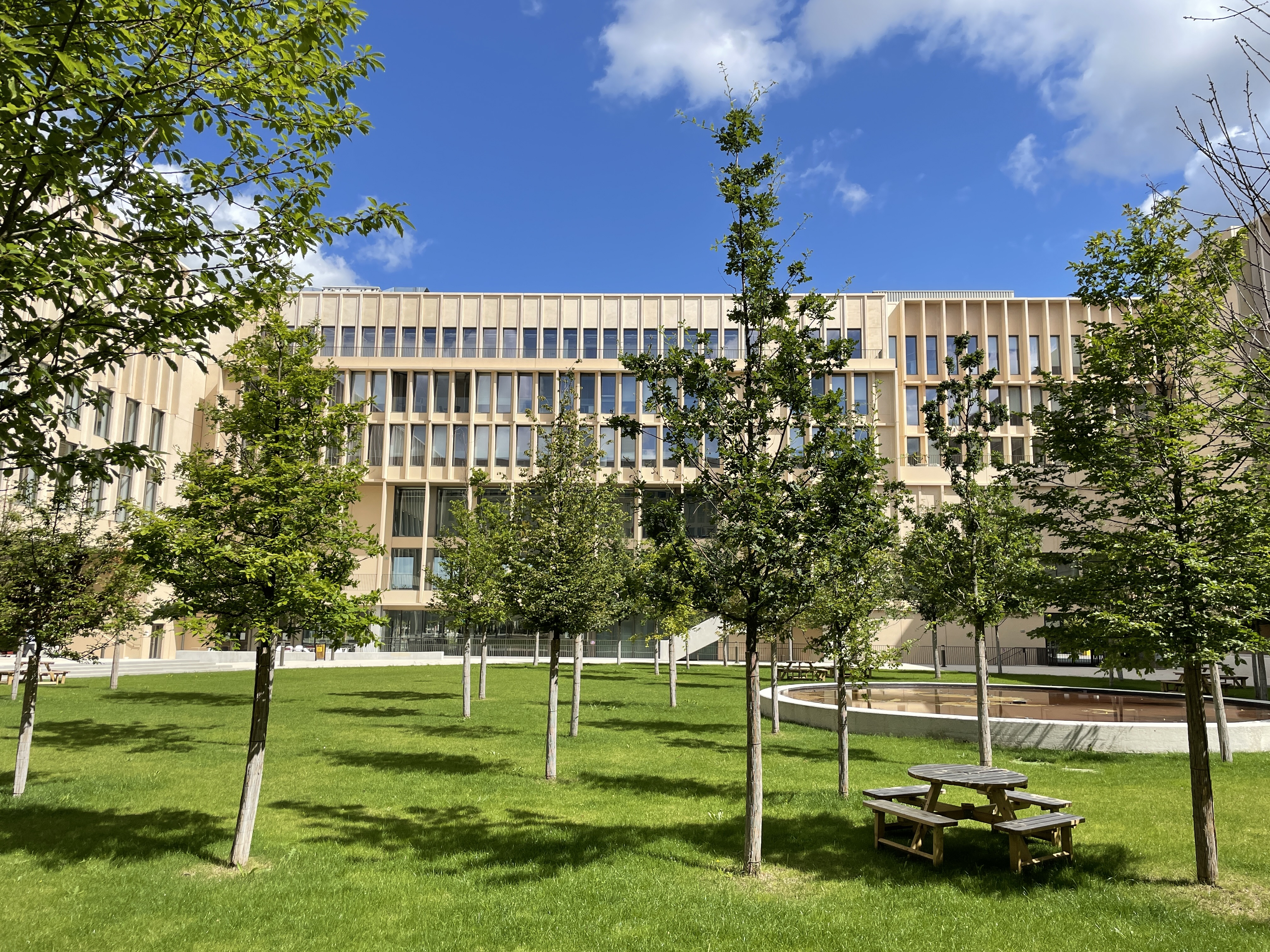
- Former names: École supérieure de télégraphie École nationale supérieure des télécommunications Télécom ParisTech
- Type: Grande école d'ingénieurs
- Established: 1878
- Parent institution: Institut Mines-Télécom; Polytechnic Institute of Paris
- Academic affiliations: Conférence des Grandes écoles
- President: Patrick Olivier
- Administrative staff: 340
- Students: 1400
- Location: Palaiseau, France; 48.7128°N 2.1994°E
- Campus: Palaiseau, Sophia Antipolis
- Website: www.telecom-paris.fr

Télécom Paris is an engineering grande école located in Palaiseau, France. It is a member of the Polytechnic Institute of Paris and the Institut Mines-Télécom. In 2021, it was the sixth highest ranked French university in THE World University Rankings, and the 7th best small university worldwide. In the QS Ranking, Télécom Paris is the 64th best university worldwide in engineering.

In 1991, Télécom Paris and the EPFL established a school named EURECOM located in Sophia-Antipolis. Students can be admitted either in Palaiseau or in Sophia-Antipolis.

== History ==
In 1845, Alphonse Foy, director of telegraphic lines, proposed a school specializing in telegraphy for Polytechnicians. However, his proposition was rejected. The school was founded on 12 July 1878 as the École professionnelle supérieure des postes et télégraphes (EPSPT). In 1912, the school's name was changed to École supérieure des postes et télégraphes (ESPT). In 1934, the ESPT moved to rue Barrault, in the 13th arrondissement of Paris. In 1938, the school was renamed École nationale supérieure des postes, télégraphes et téléphones (ENSPTT), and in the same year, the President of France, Albert Lebrun awarded the school Legion of Honor. During the Second World War, in 1942, the school was divided into two schools: the ENSPTT and École nationale supérieure des télécommunications (ENST). The ENSPTT was closed on 31 December 2002. In 1971, the ENST passed under the direct guardianship of the Direction générale des télécommunications, and the development of telecommunications during this period drove the state to create two associate schools: the ENST Bretagne in 1977 in Brest, and the INT in 1979 at Évry. In 1992, the ENST, together with the EPFL, founded the EURECOM at Sophia-Antipolis. On 26 December 1996, the Groupe des Écoles des Télécommunications (GET, nowadays Institut Mines-Télécom) was established. It consists of a group of telecommunications schools including the ENST, the Télécom Bretagne (nowadays IMT Atlantique), the Télécom SudParis, and EURECOM. On 21 September 2009, the school's name was changed to Télécom ParisTech. On 1 June 2019, the school's name was again changed to Télécom Paris after the formation of Institute Polytechnique de Paris.

== Present ==
There are two ways to be admitted into Télécom Paris as an undergraduate student:

- Through a selective entrance examination (Concours Commun Mines Ponts) after at least two years of preparation in Classes préparatoires aux Grandes Écoles curriculum following high school (in France, Morocco, and Tunisia)
- Through an application-based admission process for university students, especially from foreign universities
  - After a scientific bachelor's degree (Mathematics, Physics, Mechanics, Computer Science, etc.)
  - After a DUT degree from a French university of technology.

Télécom Paris is also one of the approved application schools for the École Polytechnique, making it possible for fourth-year students to complete their studies with a one-year specialization at Télécom Paris. Télécom Paris also provides education for the Corps des Mines.

Around 250 engineers graduate each year from Télécom Paris. About forty percent of the graduates are foreign students. Specialization courses cover all aspects of computer science and communication engineering: electronics, signal processing, software engineering, networking, economics, finance etc.

== Research at Télécom Paris ==
Research at Télécom Paris consists of:

- Optimization and transmission of information
- Improvements in data processing
- Microelectronics, such as FPGA and DSP systems
- Image and Signal processing, wavelets
- Artificial intelligence, data mining, distributed and real-time systems
- User experience Design, Information visualisation and computer-human interfaces.

Télécom Paris has four departments:

- The Department of Electronics and Communications: This laboratory consists of about one hundred researchers and teaching researchers (37 tenured) within 7 research groups
- The Department of Computer Science and Networking
- The Department of Signal and Image Processing
- The Department of Economic and Social Sciences.

The three first labs are gathered in Télécom Paris' own laboratory: LTCI, "Laboratoire de Traitement et de Communication et de l'Information" The Economic and Social Sciences department is associated with the CNRS through the "Interdisciplinary Institute for Innovation".

== Training for engineering degrees ==
First year – Multidisciplinary studies For undergraduate students, the core curriculum, commonly referred to as "common base", consists of courses in most areas of science (Mathematics, Economics, Applied Mathematics, Computer Science, Physics, etc.) and mandatory courses in the humanities (foreign languages, social sciences, liberal arts, etc.).

In the Paris campus of Télécom Paris, this primary year of multidisciplinary studies is common among Paris and Sophia-Antipolis curriculum students. It is followed by a one or two-month mandatory summer internship.

Second and Third Year – Specialization in Paris or at Sophia-Antipolis (at Eurecom) Starting from their second year, students have to choose a specialization in which they'll receive in-depth courses and that will conclude their engineering curriculum. Based on 13 specialization tracks of more than 120 courses, these two years eventually unfold into a six-month internship through which the engineering student will acquire their first real professional experience.

Third-year students can also complete their studies in an approved university in France or abroad as part of a double degree or a Master of Science program.

== Training for master degrees ==
Télécom Paris offers post master's degrees Mastères spécialisés (MS), and masters in different domains.

=== Post-master's degrees ===
- One year full-time training
  - Big Data, gestion et analyse de données massives
  - Conception, Architecture de Réseaux et Cybersécurité
  - Concepteur de Projet Digital (in partnership with l'INA) (formerly "Création et Production Multimédia")
  - Cybersécurité et cyberdéfense
  - Intelligence Artificielle
  - Radio-Mobiles, IoT et 5G
  - Systèmes Embarqués
- Two years part-time training
  - Architecte Digital d'Entreprise
  - Architecte Réseaux et Cybersécurité
  - Management des Systèmes d'Information (in partnership with l'ESSEC)
  - Smart Mobility

=== Masters courses ===
Four master's degrees of University Paris Saclay are taught by Télécom ParisTech in collaboration with other Parisian Universities and grande ecoles.

- Master Multimedia Networking (MN)
- Master Advanced Computer Networks (ACN)
- Master Data & Knowledge (D&K)
- Master Industries de Réseau et Économie Numérique (IREN).

It participates in organising several other master courses its partners offer in and around Paris.

== Rankings ==
National ranking (ranked as Télécom Paris for its Master of Sciences in Engineering)

Name	Year	Rank
DAUR Rankings	2022	8

== Notable alumni ==
- Abdeslam Ahizoune – Former CEO of Maroc Telecom
- Marcel Bayard – Mathematician who led French telecommunication during World War II
- Fabrice Bellard – Creator of FFmpeg, QEMU, and the Tiny C Compiler
- Anne Bouverot – Former CEO of Morpho (Safran)
- Alain Bravo – Former CEO of SFR
- David Cournapeau – Creator of scikit-learn
- Michel Devoret — Nobel Prize in Physics (2025)
- Patrick Drahi — Founder & Chairman of Altice
- Patience Eboumbou – Former Senator in Cameroon
- Édouard Estaunié – French novelist
- Alain Glavieux – Co-inventor of turbo codes
- Hakim Hajoui – Moroccan diplomat
- Naji Hakim – French-Lebanese organist and composer
- Bedri Karafakıoğlu – Former rector of Istanbul Technical University
- Laure de La Raudière – French MP
- Louis Leprince-Ringuet – French physicist
- Jean-Bernard Lévy – Former CEO of Électricité de France
- Didier Lombard – Former CEO of France Télécom
- Barbara Martin Coppola – Former CEO of Decathlon
- Henri Martre – French telecommunications engineer
- Gérard G. Medioni – VP at Amazon and emeritus professor at the University of Southern California
- Francisco Javier Mendieta – Founding Director of the Mexican Space Agency
- Arthur Mensch – Co-founder and CEO of Mistral AI
- Nathalie Palanque-Delabrouille – French cosmologist
- Boualem Sansal – Algerian author
- Pascale Sourisse – Former CEO of Thales Alenia Space
- Léon Charles Thévenin – French engineer known for Thévenin's theorem
