= Decathlon CMA CGM Team =

French cycling team

Decathlon CMA CGM

Team information
- UCI code: DCT
- Registered: France
- Founded: 1992
- Discipline: Road
- Status: UCI WorldTeam
- Bicycles: Factor (To 2018); Eddy Merckx Cycles (2019–2020); BMC (2021–2023); Van Rysel (2024–)
- Components: SRAM
- Website: Team home page

Key personnel
- General manager: Dominique Serieys

Team name history
1992–1995	Chazal
1996	Petit Casino
1997–1999	Casino–AG2R Prévoyance
2000–2007	AG2R Prévoyance
2008–2014	AG2R–La Mondiale
2015–2020	AG2R La Mondiale
2021–2023	AG2R Citroën Team
2024–2025	Decathlon–AG2R La Mondiale
2025–	Decathlon CMA CGM

Decathlon CMA CGM (UCI team code: DCT) is a French cycling team with UCI WorldTeam status. Its title sponsors are French sporting goods retailer Decathlon and French shipping and logistics company CMA CGM. The team is predominantly French.

== History ==
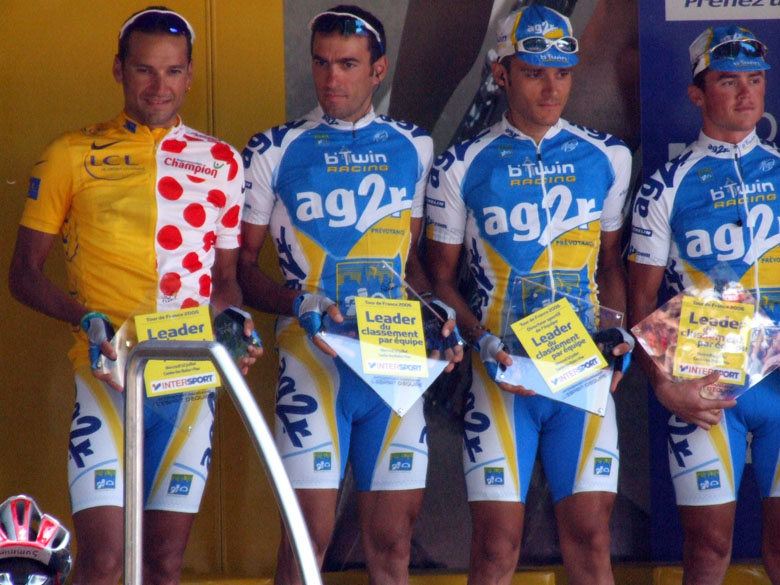
An AG2R Prévoyance team photo at the sign-in during stage 11 of the 2006 Tour de France

In 1992 Vincent Lavenu, who had just retired from professional cycling, started a professional cycling team with Chazal as the main sponsor. Lavenu had previously organised sponsorship from Chazal of his last professional team. This sponsor stayed from 1992 to 1995. In 1996 Petit Casino, a chain of coffee shops in supermarkets, took over the sponsorship of the team. At this time the team was a second division team that relied on the public to sponsor the team. The team had the saying "Petit Casino- c’est votre equipe" – "it's your team", which signified this involvement of the public.

In 1997 Casino, the supermarket chain that contained the Petit Casino coffee shops, took over the sponsorship of the team and the budget increased substantially. Lavenu's team could compete in the big races such as the classics. The team obtained successes with Alexander Vinokourov, Jaan Kirsipuu and Lauri Aus.

The insurance company Ag2r Prevoyance took over as the main sponsor in 2000. The team obtained further successes with Laurent Brochard, Jaan Kirsipuu and Jean-Patrick Nazon. In 2006, the team joined the UCI ProTour, following the signings of big cycling names Francisco Mancebo and Christophe Moreau. Fassa Bortolo's exit from the competition had freed a licence and AG2R was the only team left vying for the license, as Comunidad Valenciana voluntarily withdrew, while the proposed new team of former Fassa Bortolo sporting director Giancarlo Ferretti turned out to be without financial backing. Ag2r obtained success in the 2006 Tour de France with a stage win by Sylvain Calzati, and a day in the yellow jersey as leader of the general classification by Cyril Dessel.

Rinaldo Nocentini took the yellow jersey after stage 7 of the 2009 Tour de France after a successful breakaway in which fellow Ag2r-La Mondiale rider Christophe Riblon also took part and earned the daily combativity award. Nocentini retained the race leadership for eight stages, and Ag2r-La Mondiale also led the team classification from stage 7 to stage 11 and for one further day after stage 14.

In 2014, the team had great results at the Tour de France, winning a stage and having Jean-Christophe Péraud taking second place in the overall classification. In October of that year, it was announced that AG2R would continue to sponsor the team through 2018, at the 2016 Tour de France the sponsorship was extended a further two years – into the 2020 season.

In September 2020, the team signed a contract with BMC as their bike supplier from 2021 for three years. The team raced under the name AG2R Citroën Team for the 2021 season after the French car company announced that they had become the co-sponsor of the team.

The team experienced further success during the 2021 Tour de France, when Tour debutant Ben O'Connor ascended to victory on Stage 9 in the Alpine village of Tignes.

In November 2023, Decathlon was announced as the co-title sponsor of the team in a five-year deal, renaming the team Decathlon–AG2R La Mondiale in the 2024 season. Decathlon also replaced BMC as the bike supplier of the team, with the team using Decathlon's Van Rysel bikes with Shimano components. Citroën stayed on as the team's official car supplier.

In July 2025, Decathlon took over ownership of the team from AG2R La Mondiale. Later in July 2025, it was announced that French shipping and logistics company CMA CGM would join as a title sponsor from the 2026 season onwards.

On 29th July 2026, the team announced the creation of a 12-rider UCI Women's ProTeam, starting in 2027.

=== Doping ===
On 21 September 2012, Steve Houanard tested positive for EPO in an out-of-competition test and was provisionally suspended.

On 15 May 2013, Sylvain Georges tested positive for the banned stimulant Heptaminol and failed to start stage 11 of the 2013 Giro d'Italia. Georges blamed the positive result on the freely available product 'Ginkor Fort' (made from Ginkgo biloba). On 21 May Georges 'B Sample' also tested positive for the stimulant causing the team to voluntarily remove itself from the 2013 Critérium du Dauphiné in accordance with MPCC rules. As a result of the positive Georges was banned by the French Cycling Federation for 6 months.

On 10 March 2015, the UCI announced that Lloyd Mondory had tested positive for EPO on 17 February in an out-of-competition test. As a result, Mondory was suspended pending the outcome of his B sample analysis.

== Team roster ==
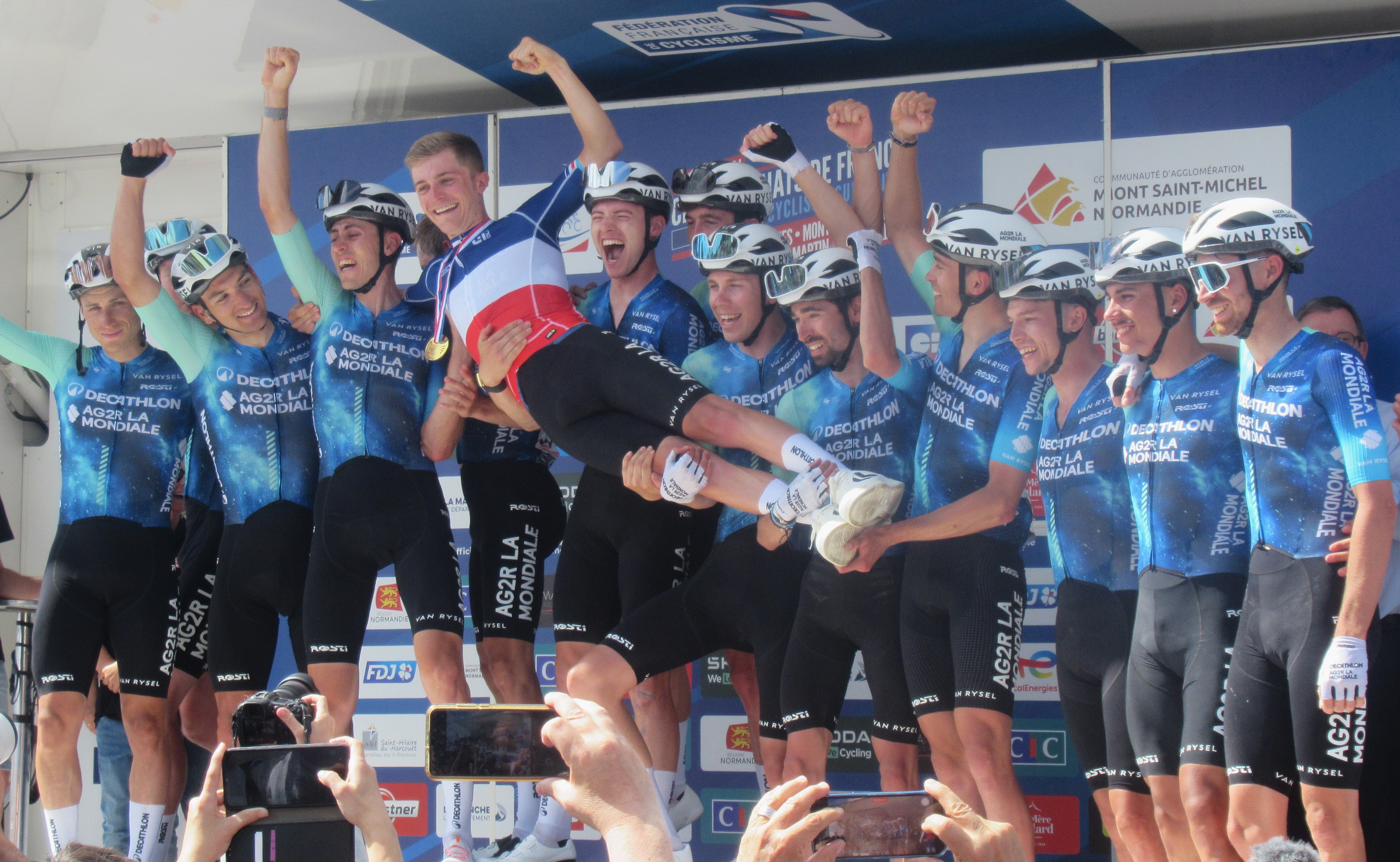
Celebrating Paul Lapeira's victory at the 2024 French National Road Race Championships

As of 23 January 2026.

Rider	Date of birth
Tobias Lund Andresen (DEN)	20 August 2002 (age 24)
Tiesj Benoot (BEL)	11 March 1994 (age 32)
Léo Bisiaux (FRA)	14 February 2005 (age 21)
Stefan Bissegger (SUI)	13 September 1998 (age 27)
Cees Bol (NED)	27 July 1995 (age 31)
Oscar Chamberlain (AUS)	15 January 2005 (age 21)
Sander De Pestel (BEL)	11 October 1998 (age 27)
Stan Dewulf (BEL)	20 December 1997 (age 28)
Felix Gall (AUT)	27 February 1998 (age 28)
Pierre Gautherat (FRA)	16 January 2003 (age 23)
Robbe Ghys (BEL)	11 January 1997 (age 29)
Tord Gudmestad (NOR)	8 May 2001 (age 25)
Daan Hoole (NED)	22 February 1999 (age 27)
Noa Isidore (FRA)	17 September 2004 (age 21)

Rider	Date of birth
Olav Kooij (NED)	17 October 2001 (age 24)
Jordan Labrosse (FRA)	15 September 2002 (age 23)
Paul Lapeira (FRA)	25 May 2000 (age 26)
Antoine L'Hote (FRA)	27 May 2005 (age 21)
Gregor Mühlberger (AUT)	4 April 1994 (age 32)
Oliver Naesen (BEL)	16 September 1990 (age 35)
Aurélien Paret-Peintre (FRA)	27 February 1996 (age 30)
Rasmus Søjberg Pedersen (DEN)	9 July 2002 (age 24)
Gianluca Pollefliet (BEL)	28 January 2002 (age 24)
Nicolas Prodhomme (FRA)	1 February 1997 (age 29)
Matthew Riccitello (USA)	5 March 2002 (age 24)
Callum Scotson (AUS)	10 August 1996 (age 30)
Paul Seixas (FRA)	24 September 2006 (age 19)
Johannes Staune-Mittet (NOR)	18 January 2002 (age 24)

== World & National champions ==
1997
French Road Race, Stéphane Barthe
Belgian Road Race, Marc Streel
1998
Estonian Road Race, Jaan Kirsipuu
Estonian Time Trial, Jaan Kirsipuu
1999
French Time Trial, Gilles Maignan
Estonian Time Trial, Jaan Kirsipuu
Estonian Road Race, Jaan Kirsipuu
2000
Estonian Road Race, Lauri Aus
Estonian Time Trial, Lauri Aus
2001
Estonian Time Trial, Jaan Kirsipuu
Belgian Road Race, Ludovic Capelle
2002
Estonian Road Race, Jaan Kirsipuu
Irish Road Race, Mark Scanlon
Estonian Time Trial, Jaan Kirsipuu
2003
Irish Road Race, Mark Scanlon
Estonian Time Trial, Jaan Kirsipuu
Spanish Time Trial, Inigo Bernardez
2004
Estonian Road Race, Erki Putstep
Estonian Time Trial, Jaan Kirsipuu
Ukrainian Time Trial, Yuriy Krivtsov
2006
Estonian Road Race, Erki Pütsep
2007
French Road Race, Christophe Moreau
2008
Estonian Time Trial, Tanel Kangert
Moldovan Road Race, Alexandre Pliușchin
2009
Irish Road Race, Nicolas Roche
2010
Swiss Road Race, Martin Elmiger
2012
Luxembourg Time Trial, Ben Gastauer
2014
Belarusian Road Race, Yauheni Hutarovich
2015
Canada Time Trial, Hugo Houle
2017
World U23 Road Race, Benoît Cosnefroy
French Time Trial, Pierre Latour
Belgian Road Race, Oliver Naesen
2018
Lithuania Road Race, Gediminas Bagdonas
Lithuania Time Trial, Gediminas Bagdonas
French Time Trial, Pierre Latour
2019
French Cyclo-cross, Clément Venturini
Lithuania Time Trial, Gediminas Bagdonas
2020
French Cyclo-cross, Clément Venturini
2021
French Cyclo-cross, Clément Venturini
2022
Luxembourg Time Trial, Bob Jungels
2024
Finnish Road Race, Jaakko Hänninen
French Time Trial, Bruno Armirail
French Road Race, Paul Lapeira
2025
French Time Trial, Bruno Armirail
French Road Race, Dorian Godon
