= B'Twin =

French bicycle brand

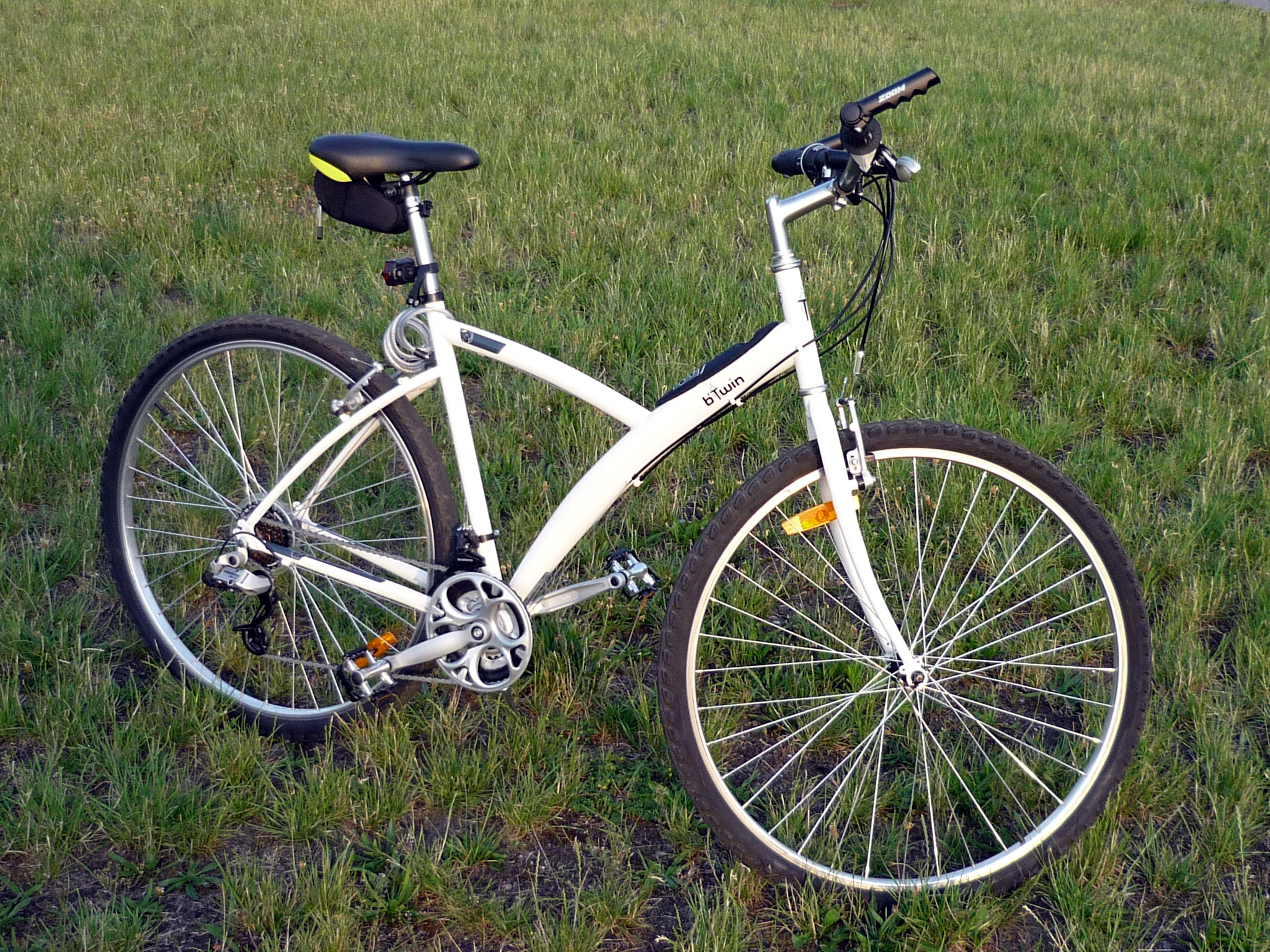
A B'twin bicycle

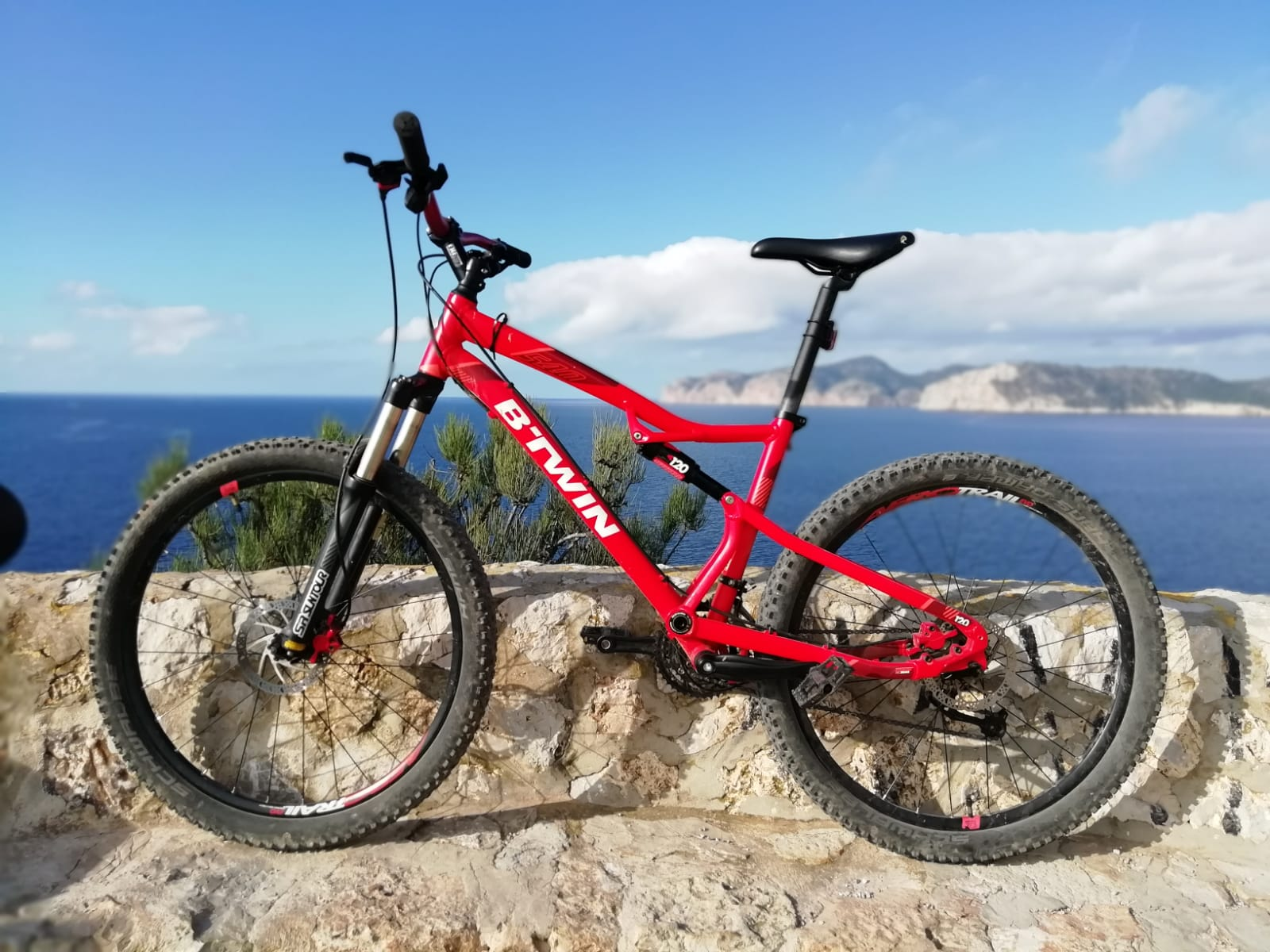
A B'twin Rockrider 540 S Mountain Bike

B'TWIN or BTWIN is a trademarked brand of bicycles as well as bicycle parts and accessories marketed by Decathlon. At present, the B'Twin brand is used for children's bikes, folding bikes and some bicycle accessories.

The bicycles are produced by several manufacturers in Asia and Europe. In 2010, a small part of the assembly process was relocated to France. From 2008–18, more than 1 million bicycles were produced in Portugal. They also sold bike accessories and parts for budget prices.

In March 2018, Decathlon said it planned to drop the B'Twin name completely. Over approximately the following year, the company migrated the B'Twin brand to children's bikes, as part of a branding arrangement that will see new ranges of bicycles, including both road and mountain bikes.

== Ranges ==
B'Twin's product range includes:

- Kids' city bikes – City bikes designed for children
- Tilt – Budget folding bikes available in pedal-powered and electric versions

The B'Twin brand formerly encompassed these additional products which have since been turned into separate brands:

- Riverside/Original – Entry-level hybrid bikes
- Triban – Comfort-oriented Road bikes
- Van Rysel – Performance Endurance road bikes, including some UCI approved models
- Rockrider – Mountain bikes
- Elops – Classic city bikes (pedal or electric models)
