= Pascale Sourisse =

French businesswoman (born 1962)

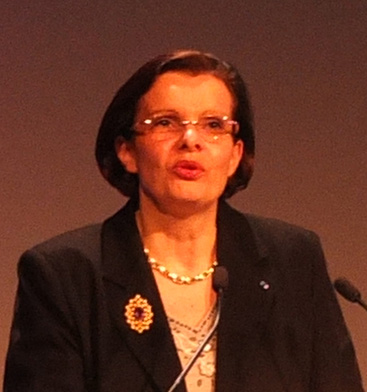
- Sourisse in 2012
- Born: 7 March 1962 (age 64); Nantes, France
- Education: École Polytechnique; Télécom ParisTech
- Occupation: Businesswoman

Pascale Sourisse (born 7 March 1962) is a French businesswoman.

== Early life ==
Born in Nantes, Pascale Sourisse graduated from the École Polytechnique (class of 1981) and Télécom ParisTech.

== Career ==
She held management positions at the Compagnie Générale des Eaux (Vivendi) in 1984/85, and Jeumont-Schneider (JS) Telecom in 1985/86. Between 1987 and 1990, Pascale Sourisse worked for France Telecom as head of the enterprise network division for the greater Paris region. She spent four years at the French Ministry of Industry and Foreign Trade as head of the Consumer Electronics and Audiovisual Communication Division.

She was president of Eurospace, the Association of European Space Industry, an international non profit organisation which gathers 90% of the European space industrialists, from 2002 to 2008.

Pascale Sourisse joined Alcatel Space in 1995, as director, strategy and planning. In 1997 she was named president and CEO of SkyBridge LP, a company incorporated in Delaware, US, to develop and operate a global broadband satellite based network and deliver broadband services.

In July 2005 she was nominated president and CEO of Alcatel Alenia Space (former name of Thales Alenia Space, and previously CEO of Alcatel Space since January 2002). She is a member of Thales's executive committee.

In May 2007, she was appointed president and CEO of Thales Alenia Space.

On May 1, 2008, she was appointed senior vice president for Land and Joint systems division of Thales Group. Since February 2013, she has been the senior executive vice-president, international development.

She is a director of Renault, Vinci and Areva, and board chairman of Telecom ParisTech. Pascale Sourisse is also member of the French Academy of Technologies.

In February 2025, at Aero India, Sourisse noted Thales's efforts to pair its expertise with startups to advance technological solutions; in May 2025, during the DEFEA defence exhibition in Greece, she highlighted the company's ongoing commitment to Greek defense modernization.^{,}

== Distinctions ==
- 2013 : Officer of France's Légion d'honneur
- 2010 : Commander of the French National Order of Merit
