= Patience Eboumbou =

Cameroonian politician (died 2025)

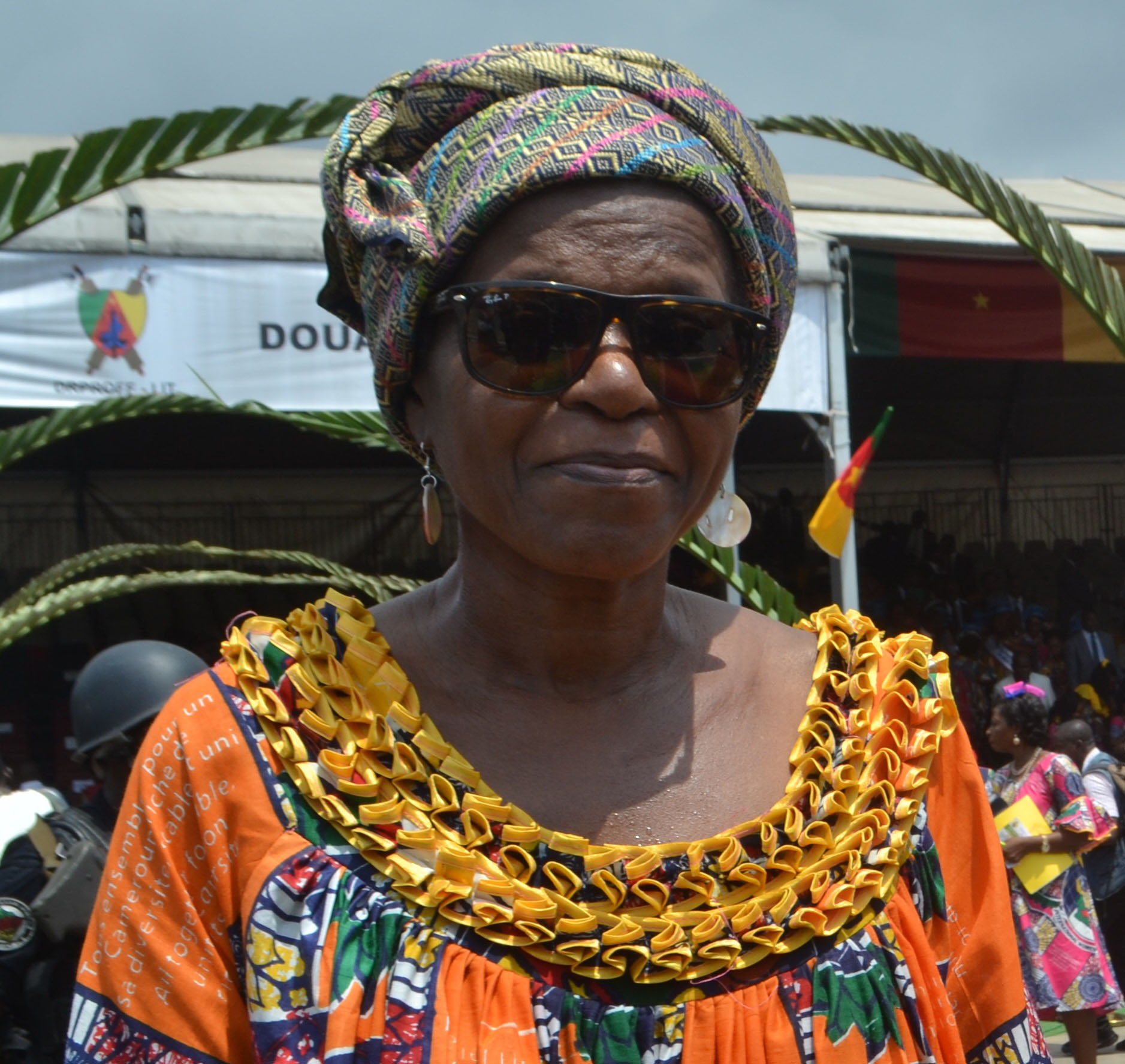
- Eboumbou in 2018

Member of the Senate of Cameroon for Littoral
- In office 25 March 2018 – March 2023

Personal details
- Died: 12 June 2025
- Party: CPDM
- Education: University of Yaoundé; Télécom Paris
- Occupation: Telecommunications engineer

Patience Eboumbou (died 12 June 2025) was a Cameroonian politician of the Cameroon People's Democratic Movement (CPDM).

== Life and career ==
Born in Cameroon, Eboumbou earned a degree in theoretical physics and mathematics from the University of Yaoundé in 1973. She moved to France in 1975 to pursue studies in telecommunications engineering at Télécom Paris. Upon her return to Cameroon, she became the country's first woman to be a telecommunications engineer. In 1999, she was appointed CEO of CAMTEL Mobile. Eight months after she took office, the company was bought out by the South African MTN Group. In 2017, she became president of the Femmes ingénieures du Cameroun and president of the Réseau des associations féminines de Douala 4e. In 2018, she was sponsor of the first diversity program initiated by GICAM, which aimed to support young girls in ICT. The program was named "Patience Eboumbou".

Throughout her life, Eboumbou was an activist for the CPDM, serving in the party's central committee and its permanent representative in Wouri. In 2018, she was elected to the Senate from the Littoral Region. In July 2020, she set up a mutual health insurance company called Mutuelle Santé Famille de Douala 4e, which aimed to assist people in benefitting from low-cost healthcare options.

Eboumbou died on 12 June 2025.
