= Van Rysel =

French bicycle manufacturer

Van Rysel Cycling
- Type: Private
- Industry: Bicycles
- Founded: 2018; 8 years ago
- Headquarters: Lille, France
- Key people: Nicolas Pierron (brand director)
- Products: Bicycle and related components
- Parent: Decathlon
- Website: https://www.vanryselcycling.com

Van Rysel is a French cycling brand owned by Decathlon, specialising in the design and manufacture of bicycles and cycling equipment (road, gravel and triathlon). The name "Van Rysel" means "from Lille" in Flemish, in reference to the capital of French Flanders, where the brand was founded and designs its products.

== History ==
The name "Van Rysel" translates from Flemish to 'From Lille.' This choice is a tribute to Decathlon's headquarters in Lille and the place where the bikes are designed, assembled, and tested. The nearby Roubaix and Flanders cobbles serve as a testing ground for quality and performance.

Decathlon has a rich cycling history, dating back decades. Formerly known as B'Twin, Van Rysel collaborated with professional teams like Cofidis and AG2R Prévoyance from 2000 to 2008, accelerating the development of bikes, textiles, and helmets.

In November 2023, Decathlon was announced as the co-title sponsor of the team in a five-year deal. The team was called Decathlon-AG2R La Mondiale from 2024. Decathlon also replaced BMC as the bike supplier of the team, with the team using Decathlon's Van Rysel bikes. Citroën stayed on as the team's official car supplier.

== Products ==
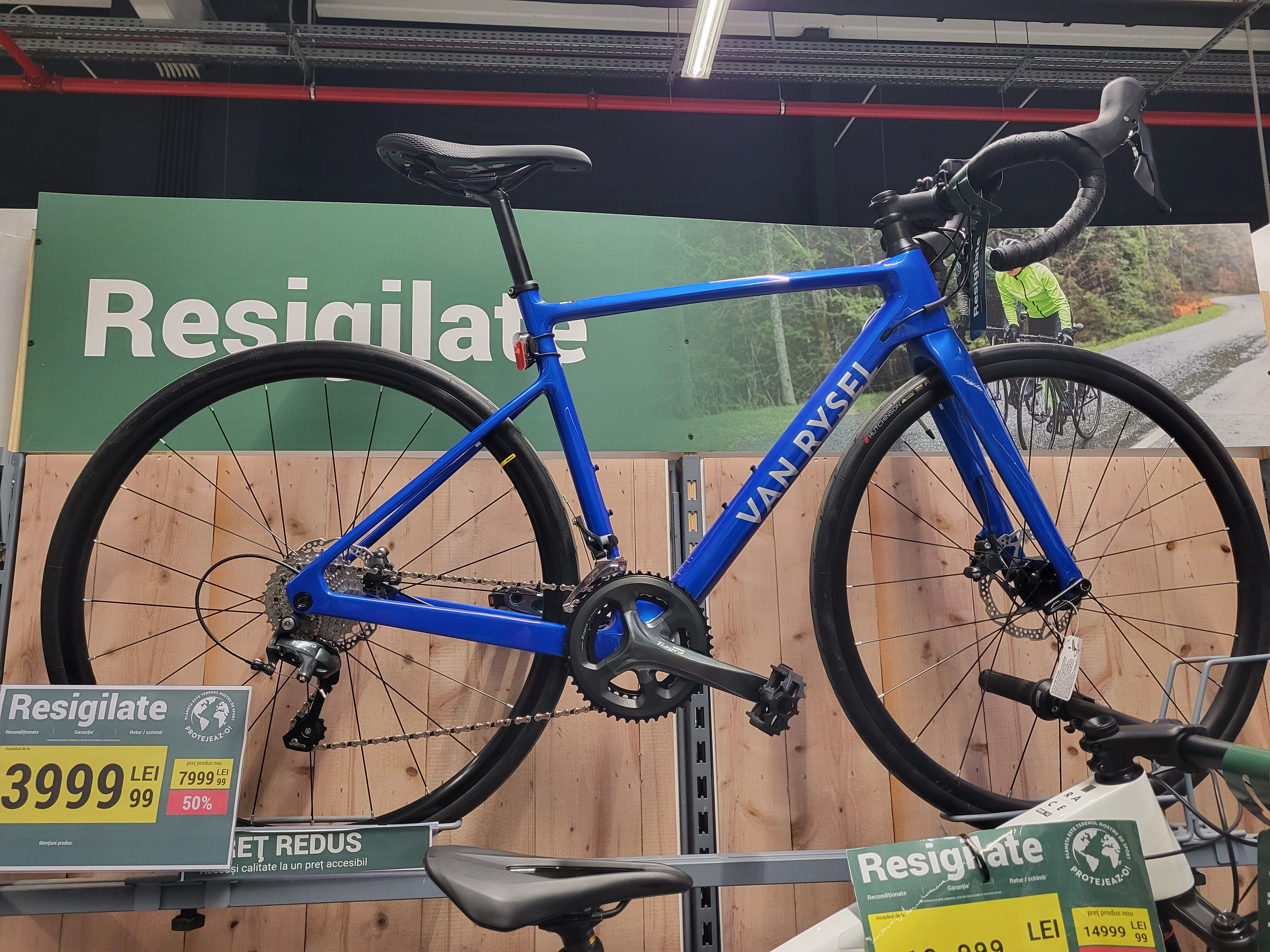
NCR CF APEX model on display in a Decathlon store in Romania

Leading the latest lineup is the Van Rysel Ultra 940 CF Shimano Dura-Ace, taking over from the 2018 B'Twin equivalent. This bike boasts a full carbon frame, Shimano Dura-Ace gears, and Zipp 303 clincher wheels with Vittoria Corsa tires. The bike is rounded out with Fizik and Deda components.

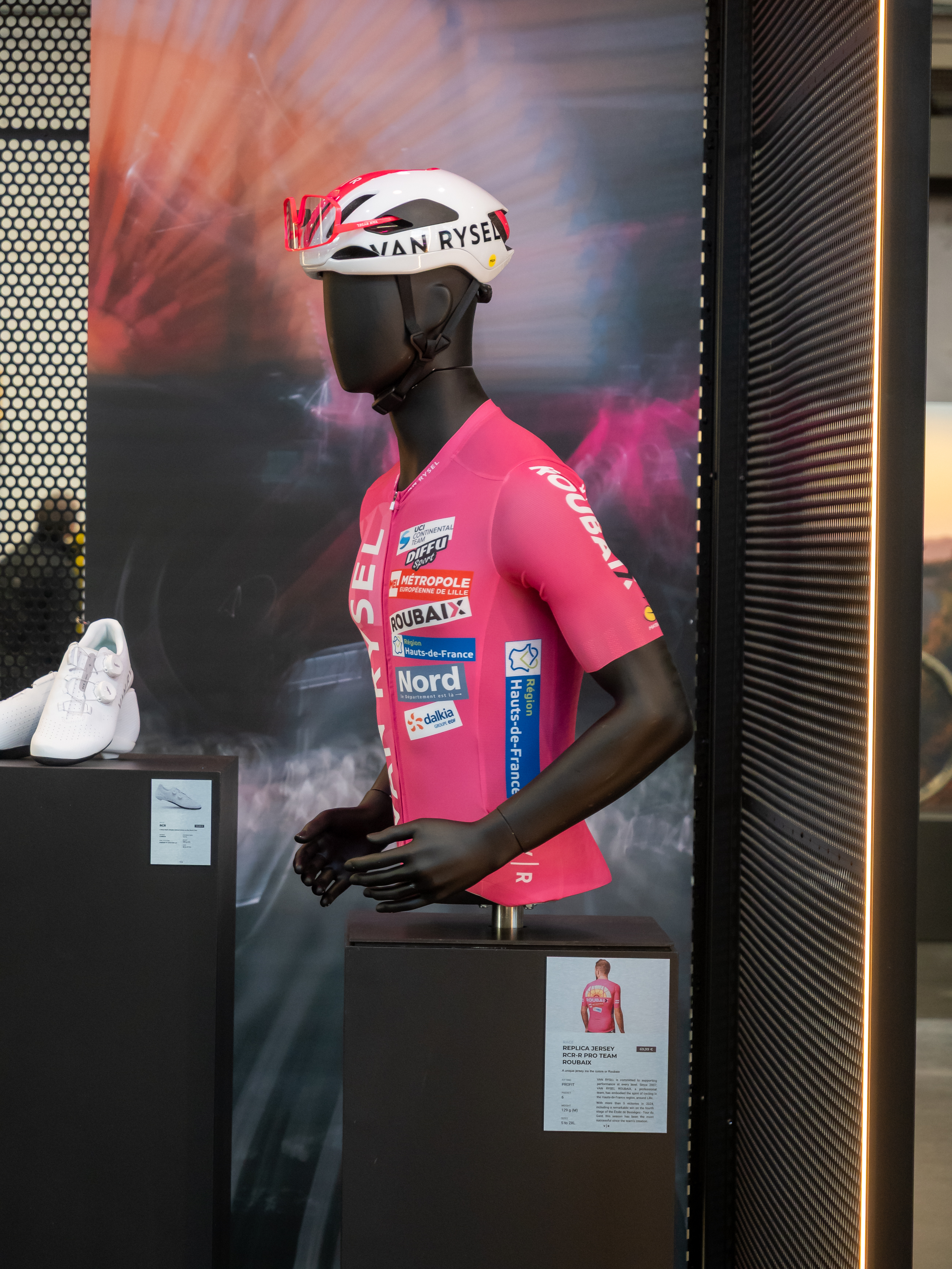
Half mannequin in cycling clothing by Van Rysel

In December 2023, Decathlon launched a new ultra-light electric road bike with the E-EDR AF APEX AXS 12S.
