= Yunlin station (Wuxi Metro) =

Wuxi Metro station

Coordinates: 31°34′52″N 120°23′24″E

Yunlin 云林
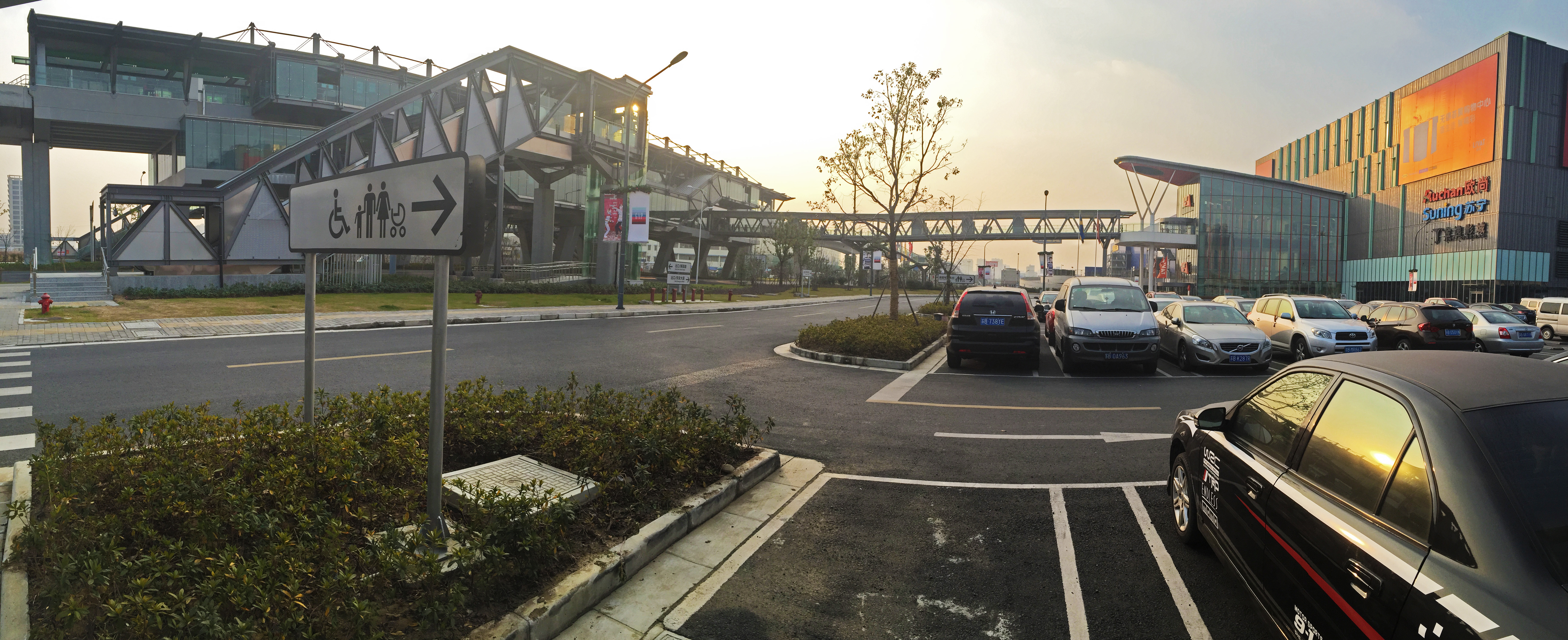

General information
- Location: Xishan District, Wuxi, Jiangsu; China
- Operated by: Wuxi Metro Corporation
- Line: Line 2
- Platforms: 2 (1 side platform)

Construction
- Structure type: Elevated

History
- Opened: 28 December 2014

Services
| Preceding station | Wuxi Metro | Following station |
|---|---|---|
| Zhuangqiao towards Meiyuan Kaiyuan Temple | Line 2 | Jiulihe Park towards Wuxi East Railway Station |
Location

Yunlin Station (Chinese: 云林站) is a metro station of Line 2 of the Wuxi Metro. It started operations on 28 December 2014. The station is near Wuxi IKEA Store, B&Q, Decathlon. The station is often congested due to this proximity.

== Station layout ==
| 3F | Side Platform, doors will open on the right |
| 3F | West | ←█ towards Meiyuan Kaiyuan Temple |
| 3F | East | █towards Anzhen→ |
| 3F | Side Platform, doors will open on the right |

| 2F | Station Hall | Service Center, Ticket vending machine, Toilet, Elevator |

Ground
| Ground | Exits |

| B1 | Equipment area |

== Exits ==
There are 4 exits for this station.

== Gallery ==
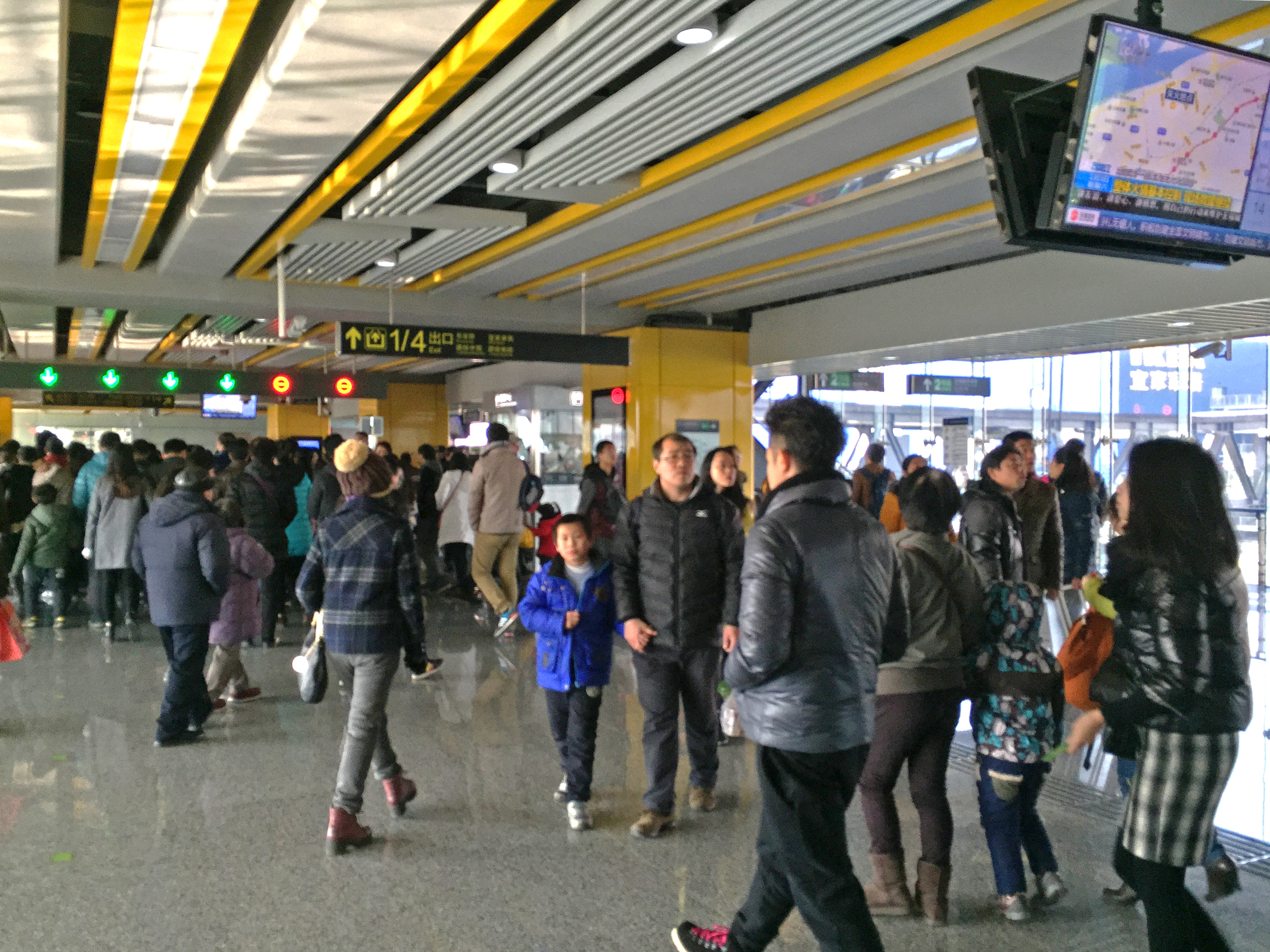
Station Hall

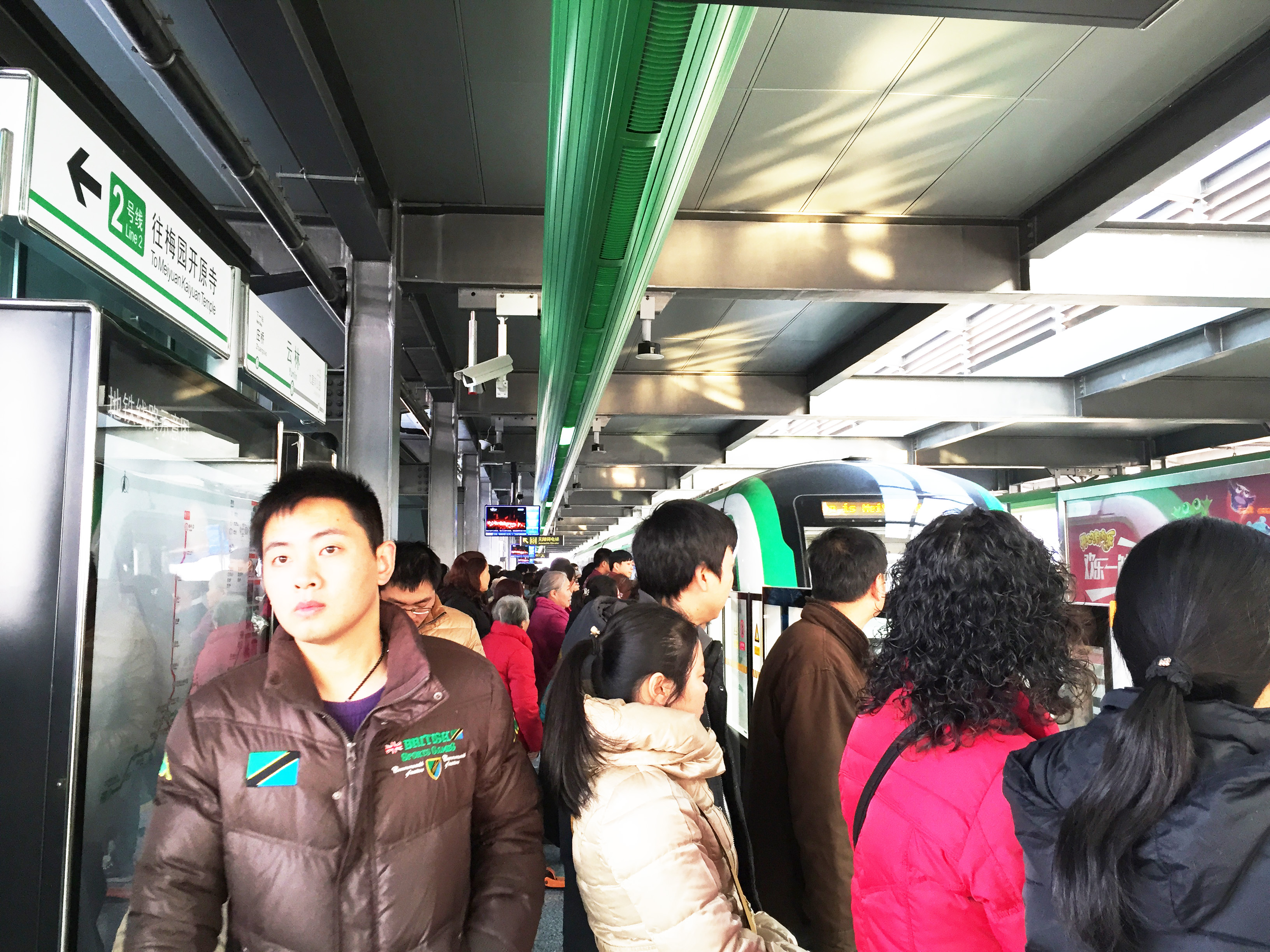
Platform

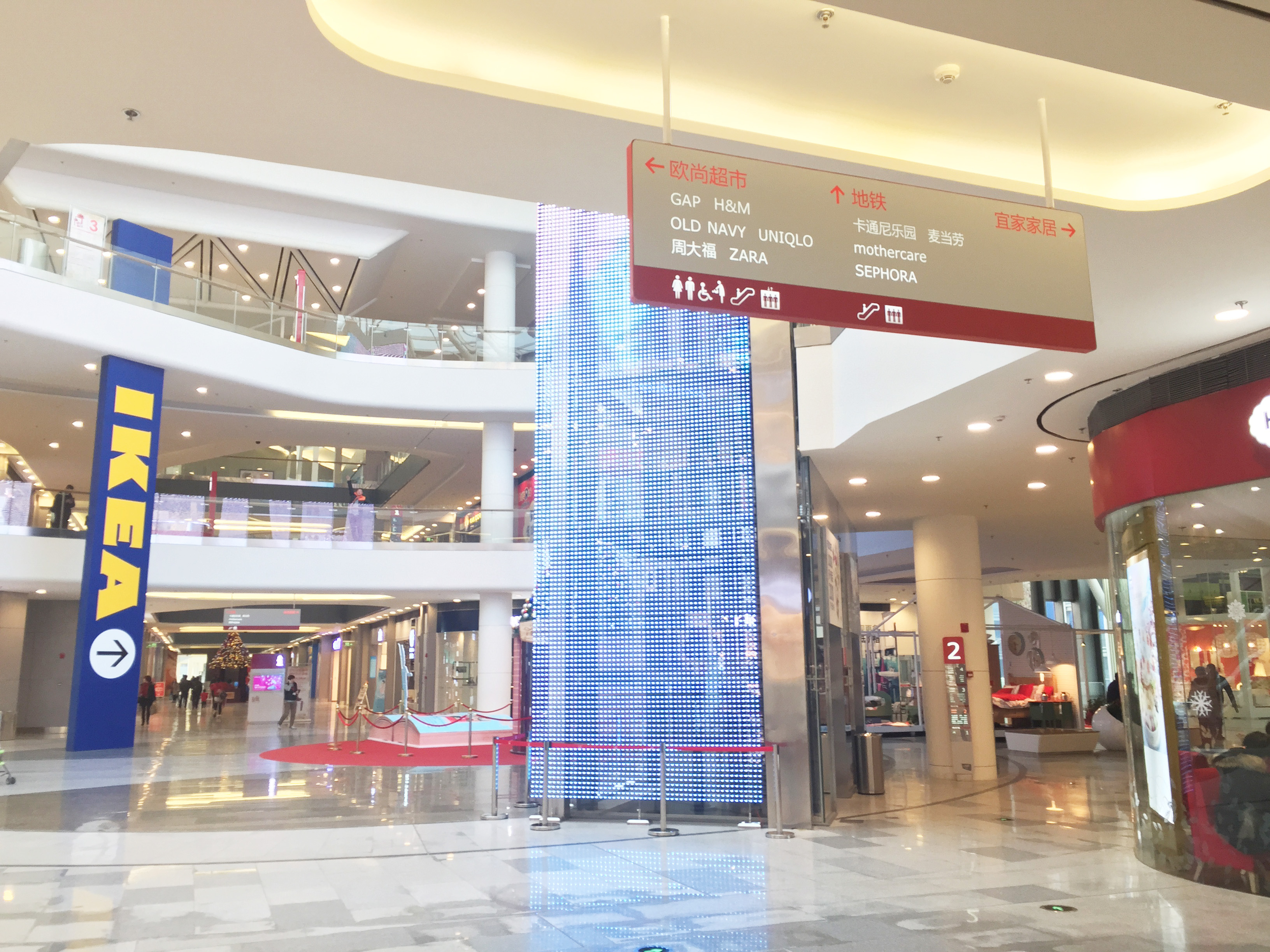
LIVAT sign for metro
