= Bedri Karafakıoğlu =

Turkish academic

Bedri Karafakioğlu
- Born: 23 October 1915; Çorum, Turkey
- Died: 20 October 1978 (aged 62); Istanbul, Turkey
- Education: Istanbul Technical University; Télécom ParisTech
- Scientific career
- Fields: Electrical engineering
- Workplaces: Istanbul, Ankara, Trabzon

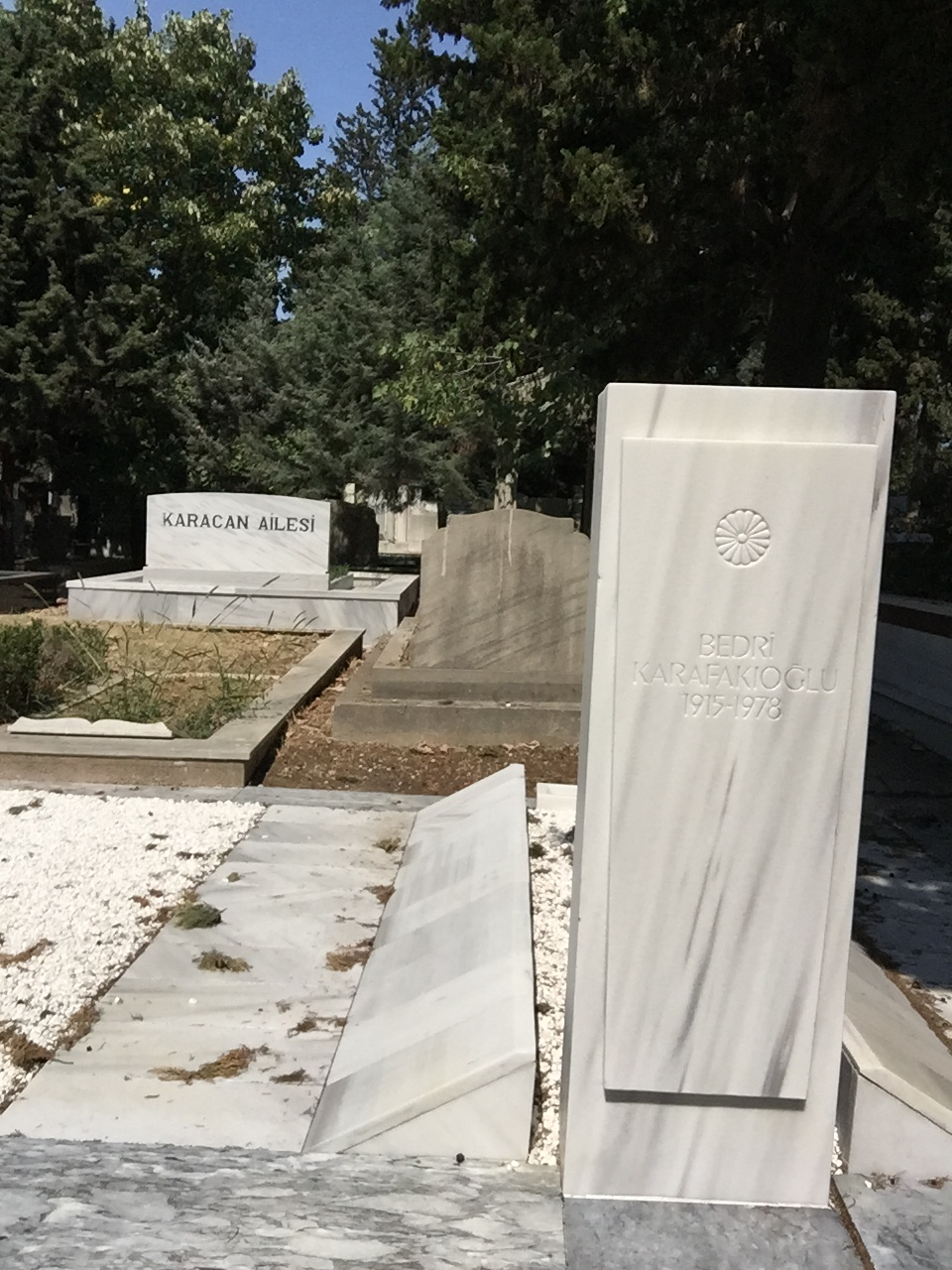
Grave of Bedri Karafakıoğlu, Zincirlikuyu Cemetery

Bedri Karafakioğlu (23 October 1915 – 20 October 1978) was a Turkish assassinated academic and former rector of Istanbul Technical University

== Early life ==
He was born in Çorum on 29 October 1915. His father Süheyl Rumi was a civil servant and because of his father's service places, he studied in various schools in different cities. He graduated from Adana highschool. Between 1932 and 1937 he studied Electrical Engineering in the Istanbul Technical University (ITU). By the scholarship of Turkish PTT, he obtained MS in Ecola Nationale Supereieur des Telecommunications in Paris, France.

== University years ==
In 1939, he became an associate professor in the newly established faculty of Electrical Engineering of ITU and in 1948 he became the professor in the same faculty. In 1960 he was elected as the distinguished professor of telecommunications in the same university. Between 1964 and 1965 he was the dean of the Faculty of Electrical Engineering and between 1965 and 1969 he was the rector of the university. Between 1972 and 1976 he taught in Karadeniz Technical University. In 1977 he was reelected as the dean of faculty of Electrical Engineering in ITU.

== Other posts ==
Between 1960 and 1961 he took part in the Constituent Assembly of Turkey as a representative of the Turkish universities. Between 1963 and 1968 he served in the administrative board of Turkish Radio and Television Corporation. Also between 1963 and 1966 he served in the scientific research committee of OECD. Between 1973 and 1976 he was a member of Council of Higher Education (Turkey).

== Death ==
Bedri Karafakioğlu was a victim of political chaos during the 1970s in Turkey. On 20 October 1978, he was assassinated while walking on the street in Istanbul.

== Books by Bedri Karafakioğlu ==
There are 11 textbooks by Karafakioğlu all of which were published by the ITU. They are all in Turkish language. 6 of them were written by Bedri Karafakioğlu and 5 of them were translated by him.

== Legacy ==
A street in Istanbul was named after him.
