= Barbara Martin Coppola =

Business executive

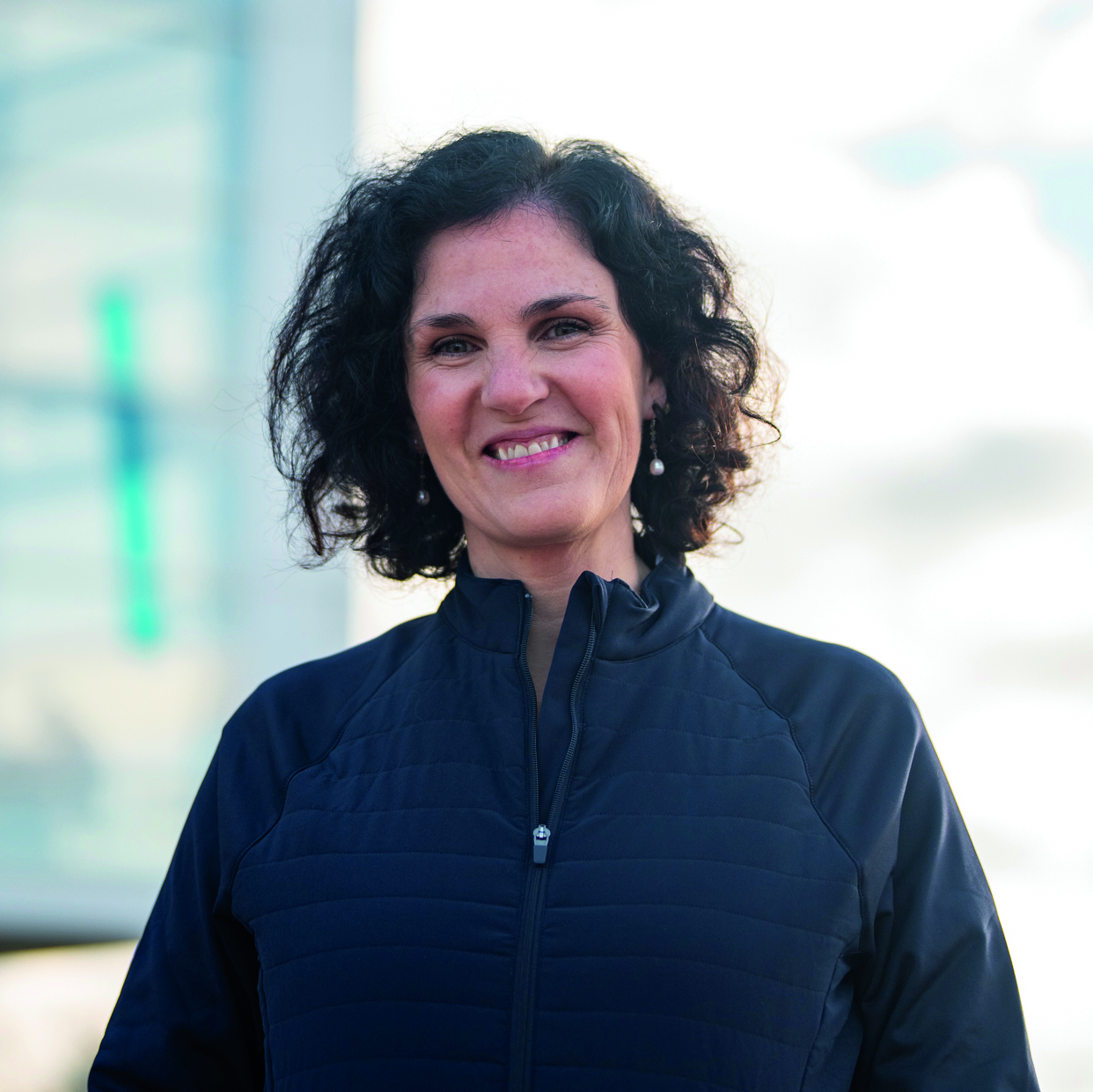
- Education: Polytechnic University of Madrid; Télécom Paris; INSEAD (MBA)
- Occupation: Chief Executive Officer of Decathlon Group (March 2022 – March 2025)
- Awards: Chevalier of the Ordre national du Mérite (2023)

Barbara Martin Coppola is a French, Spanish and American business executive. She currently sits on the board of INSEAD and the Patagonia Group. She is the former chief executive officer of the Decathlon Group.

== Education ==
Coppola graduated from Polytechnic University of Madrid and Télécom Paris in 1999. She also holds an MBA from INSEAD. She is a graduate of the Advanced Management Program at Harvard Business School.

== Career ==
=== Early career ===
After her studies, Coppola started her career at Texas Instruments, where she worked as a business development manager from 1999 to 2004. Later, from 2005 to 2008, she was the Chief Digital Officer at Samsung in Seoul.

=== Google and YouTube ===
In 2008, she worked at Google in France. and then moved to YouTube where she was global product marketing manager.

=== GrubHub ===
From 2015 to 2018 she was Chief Marketing Officer for US meal delivery specialist GrubHub.

=== Ikea ===
In April 2018, Coppola became the first Chief Digital Officer of the Group Ikea where she oversaw their digital transformation. As a result of this, online revenue increased from 11% of total sales to 25%.

=== Decathlon ===
In January 2022, Coppola became the chief executive officer of the Group Decathlon. She is the first woman to run the Group and the first female manager to be recruited from outside the Group Decathlon. She served as CEO from March 2022 until March 2025.Under her leadership, revenue increased to 16.3 billion and CO2 output was reduced for the first time. Decathlon was an official partner of the Paris 2024 Olympic and Paralympic Games and designed the outfit for the volunteers that became an icon of the games.

=== Patagonia Group ===
In March 2026, she joined the board of Patagonia.

== Awards ==
In September 2023, she won the Women's Excellence Award from the Spanish Women's Leaders Club. She was ranked 61st on Fortune's list of Most Powerful Women in 2023 and 62nd in 2024. She was appointed as a Knight of the National Order of Merit by the President of France.

== Personal ==
She is married to Max and they have two children. She is a member of the World Economic Forum. She likes to play the piano. She has lived in 9 countries.
