= Decathlon (retailer) =

French multinational sporting goods chain

Decathlon SA

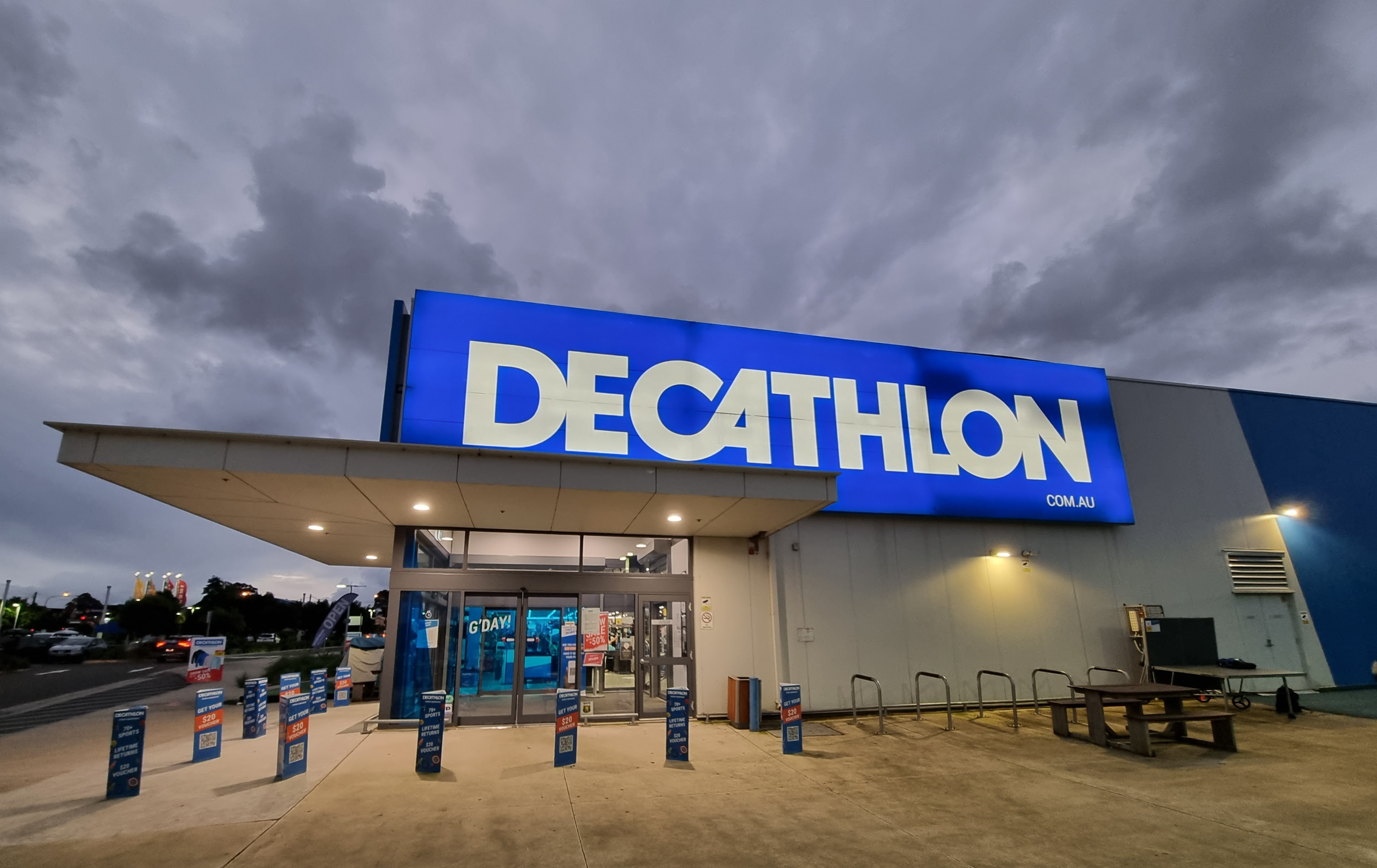
- Decathlon store in Sydney, Australia
- Type: Private
- Industry: Retail
- Founded: 1976; 50 years ago
- Founder: Michel Leclercq
- Headquarters: Villeneuve d'Ascq, Nord, France
- Number of locations: 1,902 stores (2025)
- Area served: 82 countries
- Key people: Javier López (CEO, since March 2025)
- Products: Clothing; Sportswear; Sports equipment
- Revenue: ▲€20.7 billion (2025)
- Net income: ▲€910 million (2025)
- Owner: Association Familiale Mulliez (51%); Famille Leclercq (49%)
- Number of employees: 103,000 (2025)
- Website: decathlon.com

Decathlon SA (French pronunciation: [dekatlɔ̃]) is a French multinational sporting goods retailer founded in 1976. With 1,902 stores in 82 countries and regions, it is widely recognised as the largest sporting goods retailer in the world.

The company manages the research, design, production, logistics and distribution of its products in-house; partners with global suppliers; and markets its own brands directly to consumers in Decathlon-branded big-box stores. The retailer stocks a wide range of sporting goods, from tennis rackets to advanced scuba diving equipment, usually in large, big-box superstores averaging 4,000 m^{2} in size. Decathlon Group markets its products under more than 20 brands. The company employs about 103,000 people (2025).

== History ==
Decathlon's former logo.

Founded by Michel Leclercq in 1976, Decathlon started with a store in Lille, France. Its holding company was formerly known as Oxylane.

The company expanded abroad to Germany in 1986, Spain in 1992, Italy in 1993, Belgium in 1997, Portugal, the United Kingdom in 1999, Brazil in 2001, mainland China in 2003, Russia in 2006, India and Romania in 2009, Turkey and Czech Republic in 2010, Sweden in 2011, Taiwan and Lebanon in 2012, Hong Kong in 2013, Malaysia, Singapore, Slovenia and Mexico in 2016, South Africa, Philippines, Tunisia and Indonesia and Israel in 2017; in South Korea, and Australia in 2018, and Canada and Serbia in 2019.

In September 2019, Decathlon reached an agreement with Alltricks, an online retailer of accessories for cyclists and runners.

In 2022 Decathlon closed their retail store presence in the United States.

In 2023, Decathlon opened a training centre in Lille. By October 2023, Decathlon had nine training centres in partnership with Afpa Entreprises, an association for the professional training of adults, and three centres of its own on its premises.

In November 2023, Decathlon acquired Bergfreunde, an online specialist retailer for mountain sports, climbing, and outdoor equipment. Decathlon is increasing its investments to boost production and expand its retail presence in India, from where it presently exports around 65% of its output to international markets, according to Global CEO Barbara Martin Coppola.

In July 2024, Decathlon reported its investment Recyc'Elit, a start-up specialized in the chemical recycling of polyester textiles and complex PET plastics. This year it was also announced that Decathlon is partnered CNES and Spartan Space to develop an intravehicular spacesuit. In November 2025, Decathlon unveiled its first spacesuit for European astronauts to wear aboard the International Space Station.

In April 2025, Decathlon initiated a process to sell a 30% stake of its China business, with its China business being valued at over $1 billion.

In June 2026, Decathlon acquired a 10% stake of Brompton Bicycle.

== Corporate affairs ==
=== Financial results ===
The key trends of Decathlon are (as at the financial year ending 31 December):

	Revenue (Note: "net sales") (€ bn)	Net income (€ m)	Digital sales share	Number of employees	Number of served countries (Note: "territories")	Number of stores	Number of products sold (bn)
2010	6.0			45,000			
2011	6.5			50,000			
2012	7.0			55,000			
2013	7.4			59,726	20	723	
2014	8.2			64,934	21	884	
2015	9.1			71,707	23	1,021	0.94
2016	9.9			78,267	22	1,176	
2017	11.0			82,171	39	1,352	
2018	11.3			96,002	51	1,511	
2019	12.4			102,307	57	1,647	
2020	11.4	550	19%	93,710	60	1,697	
2021	13.8	913	21%	105,000	70	1,747	
2022	15.4	923	17%	105,000	72	1,751	
2023	15.6	931	17.4%	101,000	78	1,749	1.19
2024	16.2	787	20%	101,000	79	1,817	1.18

=== Chief executive officers ===
- Michel Aballea (2015–2022)
- Barbara Martin Coppola (2022–2025)
- Javier López (2025–)

== Product brands ==
Decathlon is vertically integrated, designing and developing its own products and marketing under its more than 85 brands, with each sport, and often sub-sports and sports groups, having their own. In March 2024, the company launched a simplified brand portfolio consisting of category specialist brands and expert brands.

=== Category specialist brands ===
- BTwin – Cycling
- Caperlan – Wildlife
- Domyos – Fitness
- Inesis – Golf
- Kipsta – Team sport
- Kuikma – Racket sports
- Quechua – Mountaineering apparel
- Rockrider – Mountain biking
- Tribord – Sailing
- Fouganza - Horseback riding

=== Expert brands ===
- Kiprun – Running
- Simond – Mountaineering equipment
- Solognac – Hunting, bushcraft and wildlife observation
- Van Rysel – Cycling

== Sports team ownership ==
=== Mountain biking ===
In 2022, Decathlon formed Rockrider Ford Racing Team (later renamed as Decathlon Ford Racing Team) and entered the UCI Mountain Bike World Championships.

=== Cycling ===
In November 2023, Decathlon was announced as the co-title sponsor of the UCI WorldTeam professional cycling team AG2R La Mondiale Team in a five-year deal from 2024 onwards, renaming the team as Decathlon–AG2R La Mondiale Team.

In July 2025, Decathlon announced it has taken full ownership of the team from AG2R La Mondiale that will take effect at the end of the season. With the full ownership, Decathlon aims to be the world top three team by 2028 and will increase the team budget to €40 million. Shortly after, Decathlon announced CMA CGM as the team's co-title sponsor in a five-year deal and will race as Decathlon–CMA CGM Team starting 1 January 2026.

The team announced it will launch a women's team in 2027.

== Sponsorship ==
=== Association football ===
==== Clubs ====
- (Belgium) RAEC Mons
- (Belgium) RWDM Brussels
- (England) City of Liverpool
- (France) AS Nancy-Lorraine
- (Italy) Casertana FC

==== Players ====
- (France) Quentin Bernard
- (France) Jason Berthomier
- (France) Yannick Cahuzac
- (France) Jérémy Choplin
- (France) Julien Faussurier
- (France) Gauthier Gallon
- (France) Pierre Gibaud
- (France) Romain Grange
- (France) Antoine Griezmann
- (France) Matthieu Huard
- (France) Jean-Louis Leca
- (France) Marinette Pichon
- (France) Jessy Moulin
- (France) Matthieu Sans
- (France) Jérémy Vachoux
- (Madagascar) Jérôme Mombris
- (Portugal) Claude Gonçalves

==== Associations and leagues ====
Kipsta is the official match ball supplier for the following associations and leagues:

- (Belgium) Pro League
  - Belgian Pro League
  - Challenger Pro League
  - Belgian Women's Super League
  - Belgian Cup
- (France) Ligue de Football Professionnel
  - Ligue 1
  - Ligue 2
  - Trophée des Champions
- Ghana Women's Premier League
- (Italy) Lega Pro
  - Serie C

==== International confederation and tournament ====
- (European Union) UEFA
  - UEFA Europa League
  - UEFA Conference League

=== Athletics ===
- (United States) Paul Chelimo
- (France) Mathieu Blanchard
- (France) Jimmy Gressier

=== Basketball ===
- FIBA West Asia Super League (Official match ball supplier)
- (Belgium) Antwerp Giants
- Belgium
- (France) Alex Sarr
- (Italy) Verona
- (United States) NBA (Official licensee)

=== Cycling ===
- (France) Decathlon–CMA CGM (Bike supplier)
- (France) Decathlon–CMA CGM Development Team (Bike supplier)
- (France) Van Rysel–Roubaix

=== Indoor football ===
- (Germany) Two Stripes United

=== Mountain biking ===
- (France) Decathlon Ford Racing Team (Bike supplier)

=== Padel ===
- (Spain) Coki Nieto

=== Skateboarding ===
- (France) Max Berguin
- (France) Adrien Bulard
- (France) Joseph Garbaccio
- (France) Benjamin Garcia
- (France) Clément Huret
- (France) Cerise Michaud
- (Italy) Alessandro Mazzara
- (Netherlands) Roos Zwetsloot
- (Spain) Ian Ponciano

=== Squash ===
- (England) Robert Downer
- (France) Mélissa Alves
- (France) Antoine Camille Petrucci
- (France) Camille Serme

=== Tennis ===
==== Players ====
- (France) Gaël Monfils
- (Australia) Daria Kasatkina

==== Events ====
- Croatia Open
- (France) Moselle Open
- (France) Cherbourg Challenger
- (Italy) Garden Open
- (Italy) Napoli Tennis Cup
- (Italy) Open Città della Disfida
- (Italy) Open Città di Bari
- (Italy) Trofeo Faip–Perrel
- (Sweden) Swedish Open
- (Switzerland) Swiss Open

=== Other notable sponsorships ===
Decathlon Germany will be the main sponsor of the IBU World Cup Biathlon as of the 2021–22 season.

Decathlon bought a five-year naming rights for Lille's Stade Pierre-Mauroy for €6 million from 2022 onwards, renaming the stadium as Decathlon Arena Stade Pierre-Mauroy.

Since 2023, Van Rysel has been the title sponsor of the Roubaix cycling team, renaming the team as Van Rysel–Roubaix Team.

Decathlon became an official partner of the Paris 2024 Olympic and Paralympic Games. The partnership was extended with Decathlon supplying official uniforms to the International Paralympic Committee members for the 2026 Winter Paralympic Games.

Decathlon Lebanon is the title sponsor of the Lebanese Basketball League, renaming it as the Decathlon Lebanese Basketball League.

== Locations ==
Countries with Decathlon stores

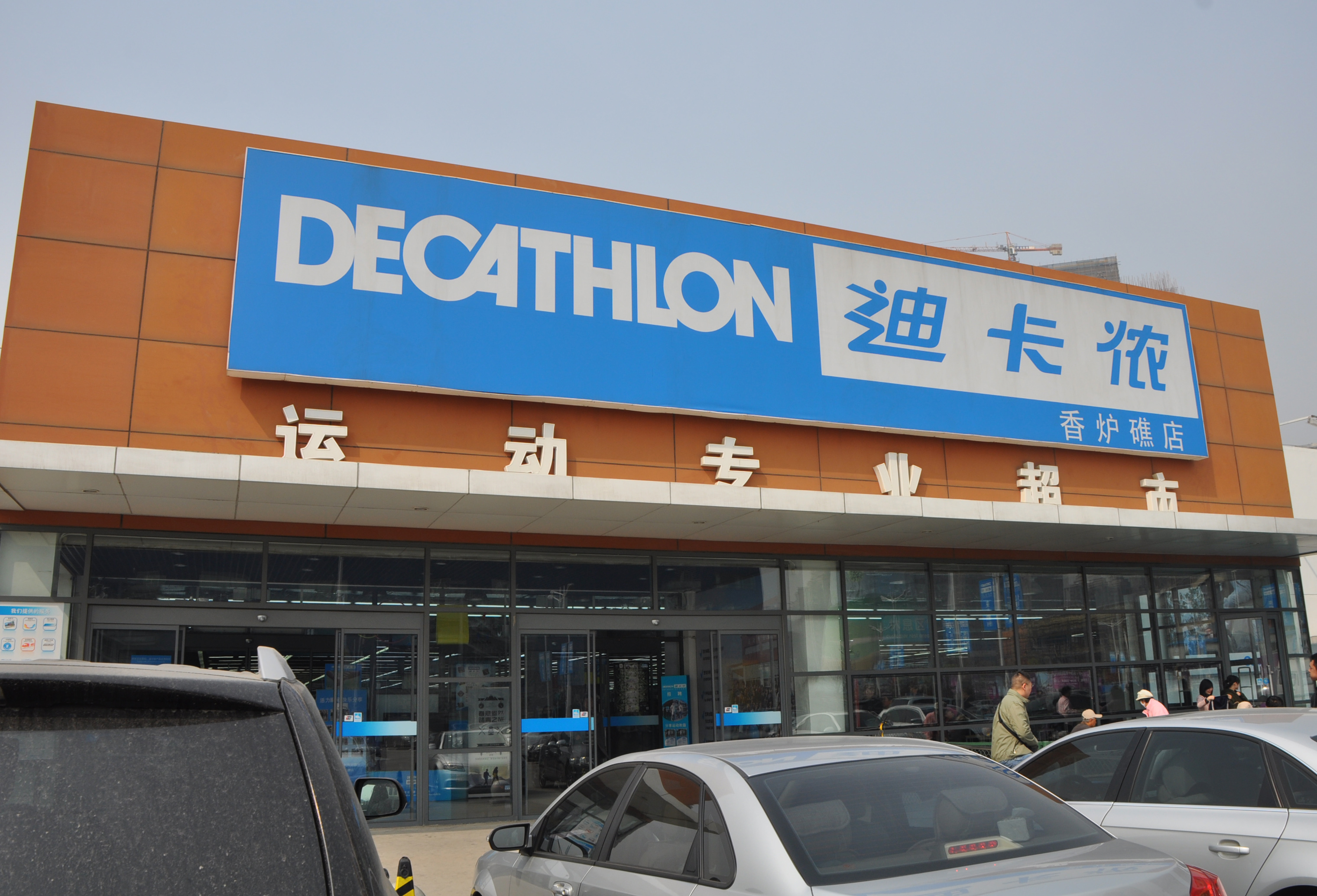
A store in Dalian, China

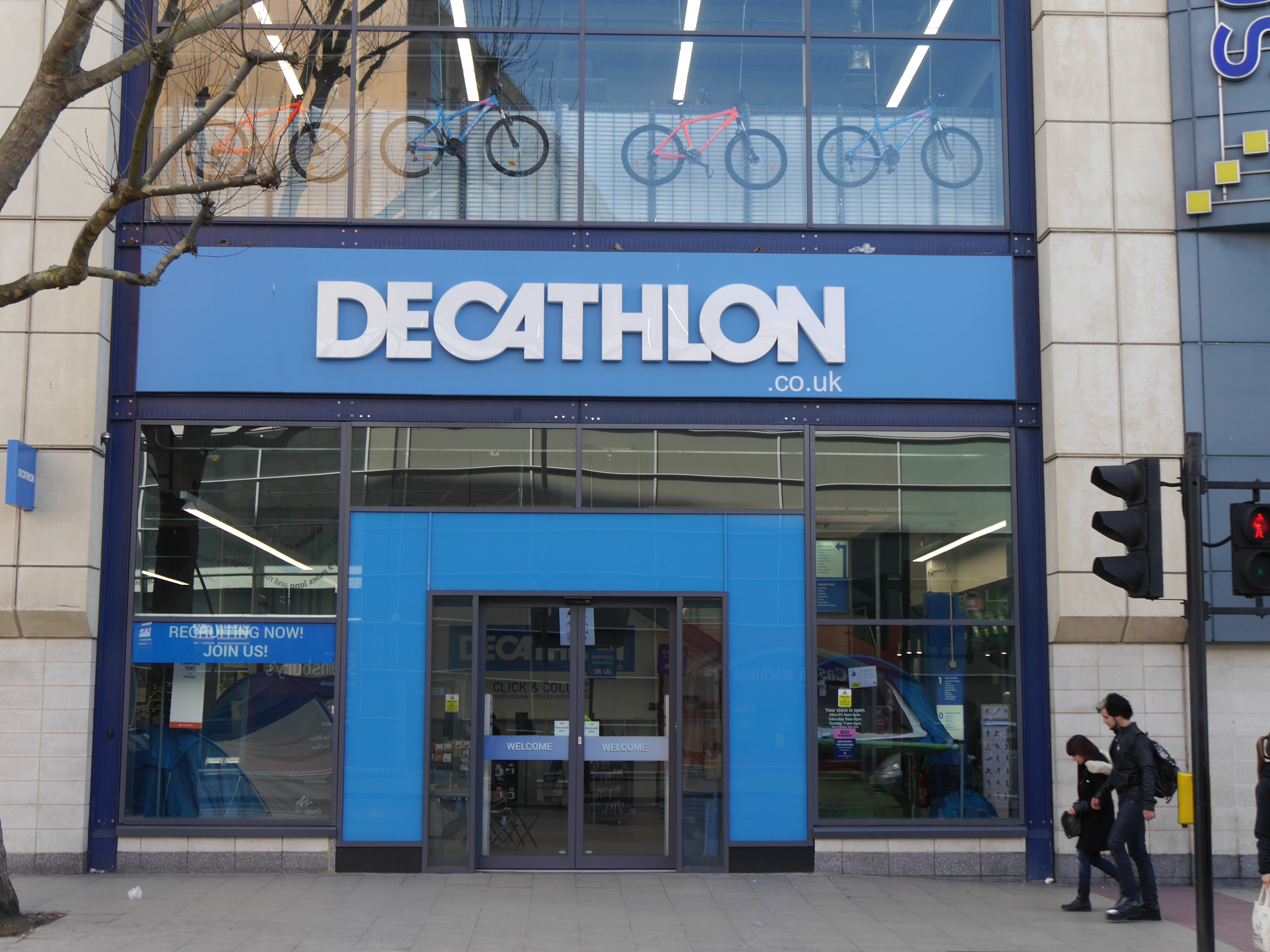
Decathlon store in Southside Wandsworth, London, England

As of June 2026, Decathlon operated 1,902 stores worldwide in nearly 1,000 cities and 82 countries.

Online delivery has been introduced in Argentina, Australia, Bangladesh, Belgium, Brazil, Bulgaria, Canada, Croatia, Czech Republic, Chile, Colombia, Costa Rica, Estonia, France, Germany, Greece, Hong Kong SAR, Hungary, India, Indonesia, Ireland, Israel, Italy, Japan, Kazakhstan, Kenya, Lebanon, Lithuania, Mainland China, Malta, Mexico, Netherlands, Poland, Portugal, Philippines, Romania, Serbia, Singapore, Slovenia, Spain, Taiwan, Turkey, Ukraine, United Kingdom, and recently, Cambodia, Egypt, Malaysia, Thailand, Vietnam and Kosovo.

In August 2026, Decathlon announced the closure of its Cheltenham store in Regent Arcade. The 20,000-square-foot store, which opened in November 2021 as the company's first store in Gloucestershire, was scheduled to close on 29 August 2026.

== Economic review ==
Its success has greatly contributed to the decline of independent retailers in France, while the spread of its own brands has caused great difficulties for traditional manufacturers. 2008 was a record year for the company as the brand Decathlon had beaten all its competitors on three key points: margin, market share, and highest turnover per square meter of retail space. It is arguably the third at a global level. A 2008 survey of 774 catchment areas at the request of the Ministry of Economy and Finance shows that "for sporting goods, Decathlon is dominant in 92.8% of zones". This dominant position has the effect of marginalizing its commercial competitors, including independent retailers.

== Competition ==
In 2009, Decathlon's sector rivals, Go Sport and Sport 2000, joined forces to set up a common purchasing centre in Switzerland, intended to "pressurize most of the major international suppliers", according to François Neukirsh, Managing Director of Go Sport, in the newspaper Les Échos. Otherwise, the company does not have significant competition due to its specific target audience in mass-market retail. Intersport is also a major competitor mainly in the European market. Decathlon has changed its name to Nolhtaced for a month in Belgium for promoting reverse shopping.

== Controversies ==
=== Human rights issues and use of forced labour ===
Decathlon has been under scrutiny after reports indicate that the company's suppliers in Sri Lanka's free trade zones violate the country's labour laws.

Since 2003, Decathlon has adopted a social charter of the Social and Environmental Responsibility World Forum regarding human rights, health and safety, respect for the environment, corruption and management and communication. Decathlon has, however, declined to disclose the names of its suppliers.

In February 2025, working with the France 2 show Cash Investigation, French non-governmental organization Disclose revealed that Qingdao Jifa Group, a Chinese textile manufacturer which supplies clothing to Decathlon, had possibly sourced cotton from Xinjiang, and had definitely taken government subsidies to "train ethnic minorities." This wording has been associated with state-sponsored forced labor programs targeting the region's Uyghur minority.

=== 2022 Russian invasion of Ukraine ===
Following the 2022 Russian invasion of Ukraine, many international, particularly Western companies, pulled out of Russia. Decathlon has been criticized for not announcing any scaling down of its operations. On 29 March, Decathlon announced that it has ceased its operations and suspended the operation of all its stores in Russia. However, reports in mid-June indicated that the stores are still in operation and may be temporally closed by the end of the month until it becomes possible to renew supplies.

In May 2023, it became known that the Turkish company FLO Retailing and the Lebanese Azadea Group were negotiating the purchase of the Russian Decathlon. FLO Retailing has previously bought the Russian business of the Reebok chain. As a result, the Russian government approved the sale of Decathlon to the Russian company ARM, which previously acquired the brand of the Spanish retailer Mango on a franchise basis. ARM promised to reopen all 35 Decathlon stores in Russia. In December 2023, Decathlon confirmed that they are supplying a limited quantity of their products to ARM for a limited time period as part of the company's disengagement agreement in Russia in response to a report that the company continued to supply their products to Russia through shell companies.
