= Hugues Mulliez =

French business entrepreneur (born 1975)

- Born: August 7, 1975 (age 51); Paris, France
- Occupation: Entrepreneur
- Known for: Member of Mulliez family
- Website: huguesmulliez.com

Hugues Stephane Bernard Mulliez (born 7 August 1975) is a French business entrepreneur. He is the former founder of Net Player Games, founder and chairman of Youg's, president and CEO of Surcouf, and founder of Progressy société.

== Personal life ==
Hugues Mulliez was born in Paris, France, on 7 August 1975. He is the son of Stéphane Mulliez, creator of Picwic, the grand-nephew of the Auchan group's northern founder, Gérard Mulliez, and the grandson of Francis Mulliez who participated in the establishment of the AFM association. The Mulliez Family Association (AFM) was created in 1955. Its goal was to maintain a patriarchal heritage intact and distribute it to 11 children in an equitable manner.

The Mulliez group brings together retail chains in the large food retail, fast food, fashion and sports sectors in France. Auchan, Kiloutou, Decathlon, Leroy Merlin, Kiabi, Flunch, are some of the companies controlled by The Mulliez Family Association.

=== 2019 boating accident and legal proceedings ===
Hugues Mulliez was charged with manslaughter after admitting to being at the helm of his boat as it collided with a Greek fishing boat with three people aboard on August 9, 2019 off the luxurious Peloponnese resort of Porto Heli, 170 miles southwest of Athens. Two people were killed and one was seriously injured in the accident. It took Mulliez 13 hours to turn himself in to port authorities in Porto Heli.

On September 27, 2024 he was convicted of "negligent homicide" and "dangerous intervention by means of a vessel" by the Nafplio criminal court. His sentence was set at six years suspended imprisonment. His greek lawyer lodged an appeal.

Pending the appeal hearing, the date of which has not yet been set, the initial bond of €50,000 was reduced to €30,000. The court also upheld Mulliez's obligation to report once a month to the Greek embassy in Belgium, his place of residence, according to his entourage.

== Career ==
Hugues Mulliez was born into a family of entrepreneurs. He created his first company at the age of 21, then sold it three years later.

=== Leroy Merlin, Blanche Porte, 3 Suisses, Auchan ===
From 1993 to 1996, Hugues Mulliez served as a salesman at Leroy Merlin, purchasing control trainee at La Blanche Porte and Aux 3 Suisses, and then as head of fruit and vegetable department at Auchan.

=== Net Player Games ===
In 1996, Hugues Mulliez founded Net Player Games in Lille, France. The company developed network games and assembled PCs.

=== Youg’s ===
In 1999, Hugues Mulliez created Youg's. In 2000, he opened the first Youg's store in Flers. Youg's was a retailer which distributed IT and digital products. The 3 stores were located in the North of France and the South of Paris, with approximately 100 employees.

=== Surcouf ===
The first Surcouf store was created in 1992 by Olivier Dewavrin and Hervé Collin. Surcouf became a subsidiary of Fnac in April 2001 when it was bought by the PPR group. PPR Group develops a portfolio of high-growth global brands.

In 2009, Hugues Mulliez purchased Surcouf from the PPR Group. Youg's was merged and applied to the management of Surcouf. Hugues Mulliez served as the president and CEO.

=== Telecel Group ===
Telecel Global was founded in 2007. The firm offers wireless telecommunication services, and was formerly known as Exxon Telecom. Offices are located in South Africa and United Kingdom.

Hugues Mulliez served as a board member at Telecel. Hugues Mulliez, along with his business partners Nicolas Bourg, Mohamad Damush, and Laurent Foucher, launched Africa Startup Initiative Program in 2019, as part of Telecel Group's CSR programs.

As of January 2025 Mr. Mulliez no longer appears on the Board of Telecel and is engaged in a legal dispute with Telecel in front of the Courts of Mauritius.
