= Venca =

Spanish e-commerce company

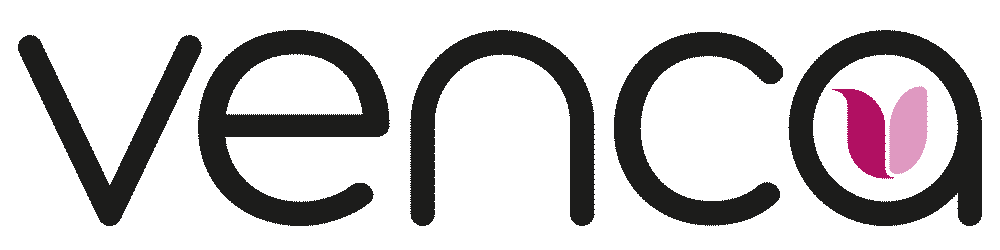
- Type: Joint stock company (JSC)
- Industry: E-commerce and catalog trade
- Founded: 1979
- Headquarters: Vilanova i la Geltru, Spain
- Key people: Jordi González (CEO)
- Products: Fashion for women, men, children, accessories and home, plus sizes and lingerie
- Owner: Digital Lola S.A.U.
- Website: https://www.venca.es

Venca is the fashion and home firm pioneer in Spain in online sales since 1997. In 2019, the company took a further step in its digital transformation: it launched a marketplace with its own collection and different categories of products from well-known brands. Its headquarters is in Vilanova i la Geltrú (Barcelona) and it has a logistics platform of 42,000 square meters. Venca belongs to Digital Lola Group.

== History ==
Created in 1976 as Venta Catálogo S.A., in 1979 it was bought by an entrepreneur from Sitges (Barcelona) and in 1988 acquired by 3 Suisses International (3SI). In the 80s and 90s, its affordable fashion arrived by mail to every corner of Spain. In 1997 "Venca.es" was launched. It was the first e-commerce or fashion e-commerce portal in Spain. In 2006 the company entered the Portuguese market.

During the first decade of this century, Venca suffered from the economic crisis and competition from fashion chains that were constantly renewing their collections. To reinvent itself, the brand replaced the two-season catalog with a six-season catalog and started publishing monthly catalogs. In 2014, Venca created a design team with expertise in fast fashion to offer constant novelties. In 2015, the company developed a technology and logistics platform with 24-hour shipping. It also entered Russia, France, Belgium and Slovakia.

After the acquisition of the property by its management team, Venca began a quick digital transformation with the progressive reduction of its printed catalog and the closure of its only physical store in Barcelona.

== Digital transformation ==
In 2018, Venca expanded its e-commerce "Venca.com" to more than 80 countries. The launch of Venca.com is within the framework of the company's digital transformation plan, with a total investment of 3 million euros. In 2016, the company invested more than 2 million euros in the platform to operate in different countries and languages. This investment also included the implementation of artificial intelligence and visual search digital tools to further enhance the customer experience.

=== Marketplace: Portfolio expansion ===
At the end of 2019, Venca launched its own marketplace with the aim of expanding the portfolio with other fashion brands and opening up to new categories such as footwear, jewelry, home, small appliances, beauty and electronics, offering more than 100,000 products from over 900 different brands and stores. In addition, several methods of stock management are integrated (such as cross docking, drop shipping, and advanced stock. The Venca.com platform is present in more than 80 countries, although its two main markets remain Spain and Portugal.

=== Process optimization and digitization ===
In addition to improving the front-end, Venca has also worked on organizing the back-end optimization. In this sense, the company is committed to new tools that offer a better customer experience such as "MK Automation and CRM". The purpose of these tools is to improve the customer experience and provide a personal and interactive dialogue with them.

== Company Management ==
The company 3SI had belonged 50% to the French group Mulliez - owners of Auchan, Decathlon, Leroy Merlin, Kiabi - and in another 50% to the German Otto, which had later taken over the entire capital. In early 2017, some of Venca's management team, acquired the entire capital of the company until then owned by the French group 3SI. This Management Buy Out (MBO) operation was completed a year and a half after the company was put up for sale, giving rise to the new company Digital Lola S.A.U., whereby Venca became part of Digital Lola.

The new company that owns Venca is headed by Jordi González, CEO, and also includes Paz Usandizaga, CFO and HR Director, Jordi Badia, ICT Director, and Joan Alemany, Operations Director.
