= Olivier Leclercq =

French billionaire businessman (born 1964)

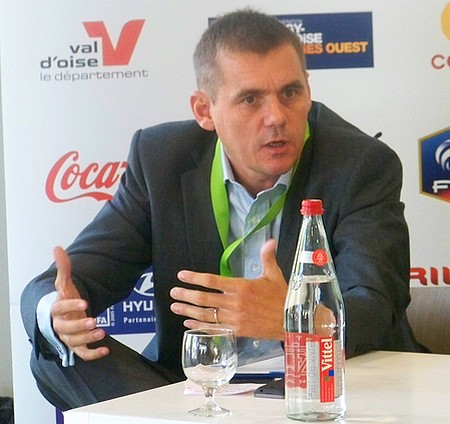
- Leclercq, Salif Keita Stadium Inauguration, 2009
- Born: 27 April 1964 (age 61); Roubaix, France
- Occupation: Businessman
- Years active: 1988–present
- Known for: Owner, Olivarius Hotels,
- Spouse: Nathalie Fleurie Wibaut (div. 2018)
- Children: 3
- Parent: Michel Leclercq

Olivier Leclercq (born 1964) is a French billionaire businessman. He is a hotelier, designer, and owner of Olivarius Hotels, a private equity investor in California, and a Montecito, California real estate investor and developer. In 2014, magazine La Voix du Nord reported Leclercq's net worth as Euro 1.76 billion.

He is the former chairman of Decathlon, one of the world's largest sporting goods retailers, which was founded by his father Michel Leclercq. The family owns 49% of the company. Leclercq is a member of the Mulliez family, the 12th wealthiest family in the world. Through Olivarius Hospitality California, Leclercq is the sole owner of Coolibar, an industry leader in proprietary sun-protective clothing.

== Personal life ==
Leclercq is a member of the Mulliez family, known for the founding and ownership of supermarket chain Auchan, the 12th wealthiest family in the world. Olivier is the first son of, Michel Leclercq, the founder of Decathlon, the largest sporting good retailer in the world, both of whom are on the board of directors. in 2018, Bloomberg reported the Mulliez family net worth as US$37.5 billion.

He was divorced from his ex-wife Nathalie Fleurie Wibaut on September 10, 2018, and they have three children.
