= ACI Jet =

Aviation services company based in San Luis Obispo, California

- Type: Private
- Industry: Private Jet Charter; FBO; Aircraft Maintenance
- Founded: February 20, 1998; 28 years ago in San Luis Obispo, California, United States of America
- Founder: William Borgsmiller
- Headquarters: San Luis Obispo, California
- Key people: William Borgsmiller (CEO); Olivier Leclercq (Executive vice-president); Nathan Ross (CFO)
- Website: acijet.com

Aviation Consultants Inc. operating as ACI Jet is a privately owned aviation services company based in San Luis Obispo, California. It was founded in 1998 by William Borgsmiller.

== History ==
ACI Jet was founded in 1998 as an air charter company with a single light aircraft, the twin-engine Piper Seneca III. In 2002, ACI Jet added their first light jet to the fleet; a Cessna Citation CJ2. As of 2020, ACI Jet had 11 private jet aircraft.

In August 2014, private investor and French investor Olivier Leclercq invested an undisclosed sum in ACI Jet, providing staff and operations expansion. Leclercq's funds contributed directly to ACI Jet's Employee Flight Department, a service that allows employees to access the fleet's light aircraft.

In September 2017, ACI Jet acquired a facility at John Wayne Airport in Santa Ana, California (SNA), through an RFQ award.

ACI Jet North Hanger at KSNA

Their headquarters at the San Luis Obispo County Regional Airport was expanded and was expected to be completed in early 2019.

In February 2018, Leclercq purchased three new aircraft for the fleet: two Bombardier Globals and an Embraer Phenom 300, focusing on additional international travel.

ACI Jet had plans to finalize a new facility in March 2020, adding 30,000 sq. ft. of MRO hangar space and 36,000 sq. ft. of office space. The additional space was intended to support the expansion of the business' flight-operations services.

In October 2022, ACI completed the acquisition of the Van Nuys Airport-based aircraft maintenance operation.
