= Adeo =

French hardware store operator

- Formerly: Groupe Leroy Merlin (1923 - 2007)
- Company type: Limited Company with a Board of Directors
- Industry: activities of head offices
- Founded: 1923 (Leroy Merlin), 2007 (Adeo)
- Key people: Thomas Bouret (CEO); Pierre-Alain Vielvoye (Chairman)
- Number of employees: 110 000 for the whole Group
- Parent: Association Familiale Mulliez
- Website: https://www.adeo.com/

Adeo, formerly Groupe Leroy Merlin, is a French holding company that groups together companies which sell consumer goods for bricolage and home decoration. It is majority-held by the Association familiale Mulliez.

The company is the parent company of Leroy Merlin, and medium-sized DIY stores such as Weldom and Bricocenter, and the M brand dedicated to professionals, which includes Bricoman (France and Poland), Obramat (Spain), Tecnomat (Italy) and Obramax (Brazil).

== Presentation ==
Adeo brings together various brands that are present in 21 countries through its 1,000 points of sale and 7 marketplaces.

== History ==
In 1979, the Mulliez family acquired a stake in Leroy Merlin. In 1989, the Group expanded its operations to Spain.

In 1994, the Group purchased Bricoman in Belgium from the Louis Delhaize Group. The brand was launched in France in 1999. However, the Group left the Belgian market in 2003 as it sold the stores to the Dutch Group Vendex KBB.

In 2003, the Group purchased Aki, Spanish and Portuguese stores.

In 2007, the Mulliez Group changed its name from Leroy Merlin to Adeo to avoid confusion with one of its brands, Leroy Merlin.

In 2008, Leroy Merlin acquired William Obrist in Poland for €45 million. The company grew from 3 to 24 stores.

In October 2014, the Adeo Group bought Quotatis.

In March 2023, Adeo announced its plan to transfer Leroy Merlin from Russia, after more than 18 years of activity there, to the local management at its parent company. The same year, it was announced that Thomas Bouret would succeed Philippe Zimmerlann and start operating as the new CEO of Adeo in January 2024. Also in 2023, Adeo acquired Saint-Maclou.

== Activities and locations ==
In 2023, ADEO owns 6 retail brands and is present in 21 countries around the world, with more than 1,000 stores.

== Subsidiaries ==
- Leroy Merlin : Large DIY stores located in France, Cyprus, Greece, Italy, Poland, Portugal, Romania, Spain, Ukraine, Brazil and South Africa.
- Weldom : Small and medium DIY convenience stores located in France.
- Bricocenter : Medium DIY local stores located in Italy.
- Bricoman : DIY and building materials stores for professionals (France and Poland), Obramat (Spain), Tecnomat (Italy) and Obramax (Brazil).
- Saint-Maclou : Floor coverings installation and distribution specialist located in France
- Kbane : Sustainable housing and new energies specialist located in France.
- Quotatis : specialist in online work quotes^{,}^{,}.
