= John Wayne Airport =

Airport serving Orange County and Santa Ana, California, United States

- IATA: SNA; ICAO: KSNA; FAA LID: SNA

Summary
- Airport type: Public
- Owner/Operator: Orange County, California
- Serves: Orange County; Santa Ana; Greater Los Angeles
- Location: 18601 Airport Way; Santa Ana, California, U.S.
- Opened: 1923; 103 years ago
- Elevation AMSL: 56 ft (17 m)
- Coordinates: 33°40′32″N 117°52′06″W
- Website: www.ocair.com

Maps
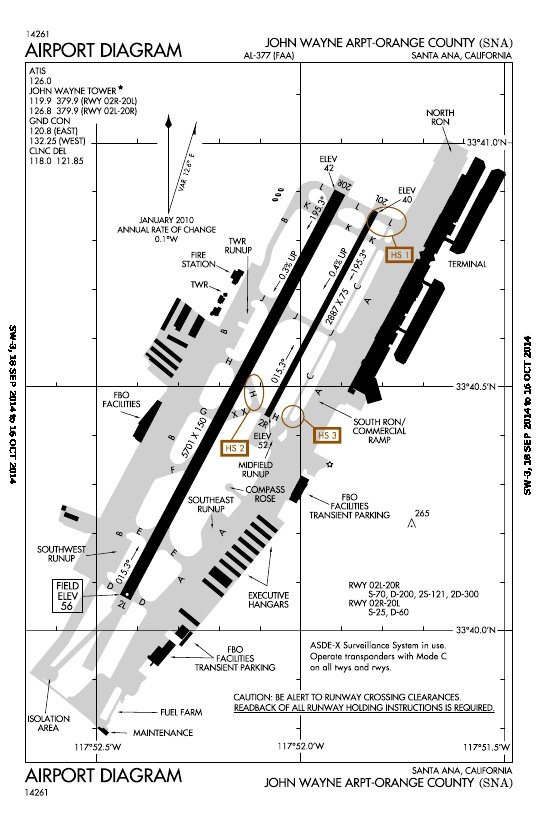
- FAA airport diagram

- Location within the Los Angeles metropolitan area Location within California Location within the United States
- Interactive map of John Wayne Airport

Runways
Direction	Length		Surface
Direction	ft	m	Surface
02L/20R	5,700	1,737	Asphalt
02R/20L	2,886	880	Asphalt

Statistics (2025)
- Passengers: 11,369,865
- Aircraft operations: 319,042
- Source: Federal Aviation Administration

John Wayne Airport (IATA: SNA, ICAO: KSNA, FAA LID: SNA) is an international commercial and general aviation airport that serves Orange County and Greater Los Angeles, in the U.S. state of California. The airport is located in an unincorporated area of Orange County, and it is owned and operated by Orange County. John Wayne Airport is surrounded by the cities of Irvine, Newport Beach, and Costa Mesa, and is separated from the city limits of Santa Ana (from which the IATA airport code SNA is derived) by Interstate 405 and State Route 55. Originally named Orange County Airport, the Orange County Board of Supervisors renamed the airport in 1979 in honor of actor John Wayne, who lived in neighboring Newport Beach and died that year. A statue of John Wayne was installed at the airline terminal in 1982.

John Wayne Airport is the sole commercial airport in Orange County. The National Plan of Integrated Airport Systems for 2023–2027 categorized it as a primary commercial service airport since it has over 10,000 passenger boardings per year. Federal Aviation Administration records say the airport had 5,370,273 enplanements in calendar year 2024, a decrease from 5,706,332 in 2023. In 2024, John Wayne Airport was the second busiest airport in the Greater Los Angeles area by passenger count with over 10 million total passengers. As of 2023, the largest airlines at John Wayne Airport were Southwest Airlines, American Airlines, United Airlines, Delta Air Lines, and Alaska Airlines.

In addition to the airline terminal, several facilities at the airport serve the general aviation and corporate aviation community. General aviation operations outnumber commercial operations. The only other general aviation airport in Orange County is Fullerton Municipal Airport.

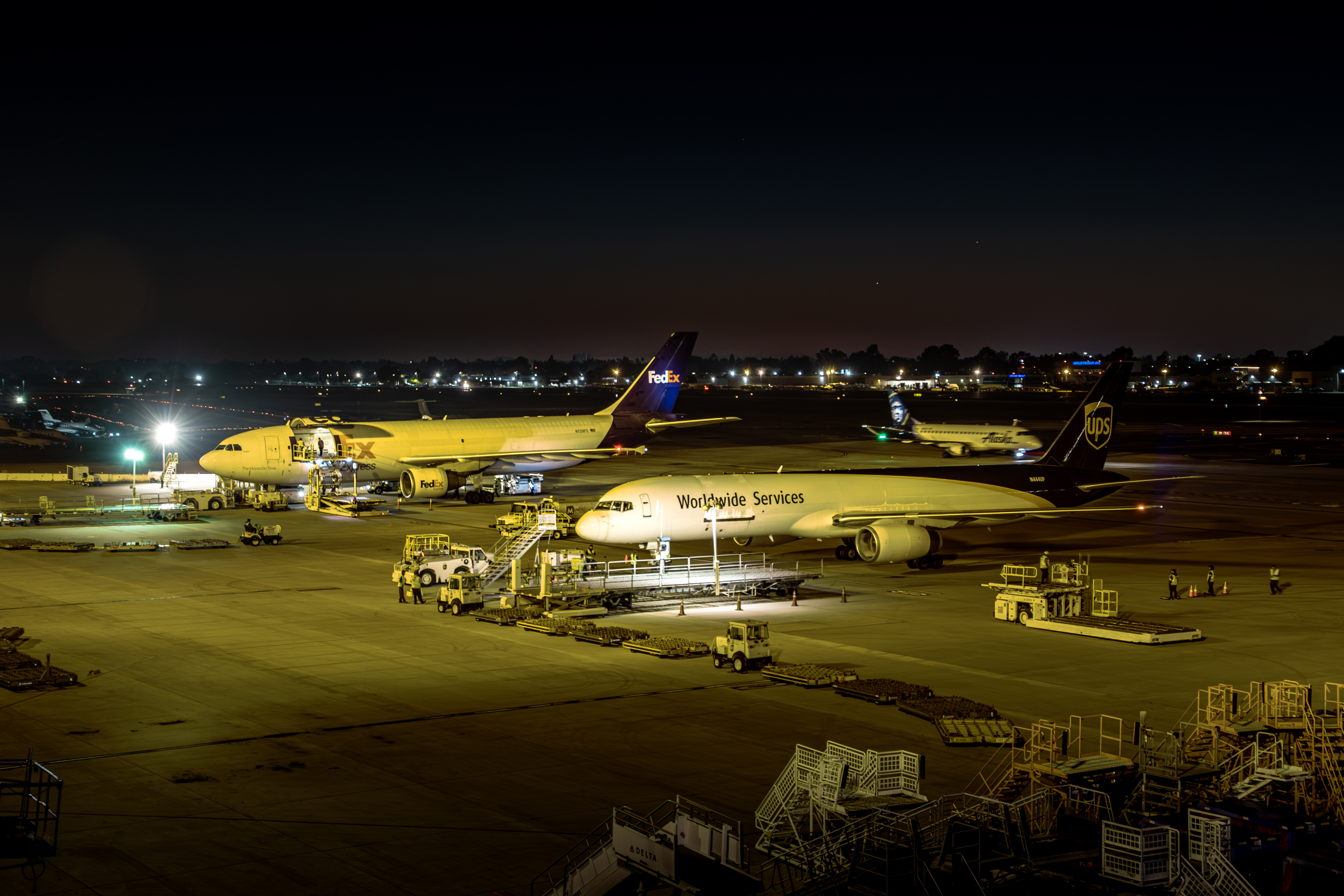
FedEx A300 and UPS Boeing 757 at John Wayne Airport

John Wayne Airport has two runways. The main runway, 2L/20R, at 5,700 feet (1,700 m) in length, is the shortest runway in the United States that handles regularly scheduled international flights, and passenger jetliners operating from the airport have never been larger than the Boeing 757. No widebody passenger jetliners have ever been operated into SNA in scheduled airline service, although some larger cargo aircraft fly from SNA, such as the widebody Airbus A300 operated by FedEx. Runway 2R/20L is 2,887 feet (880 m) long and serves general aviation aircraft.

== History ==
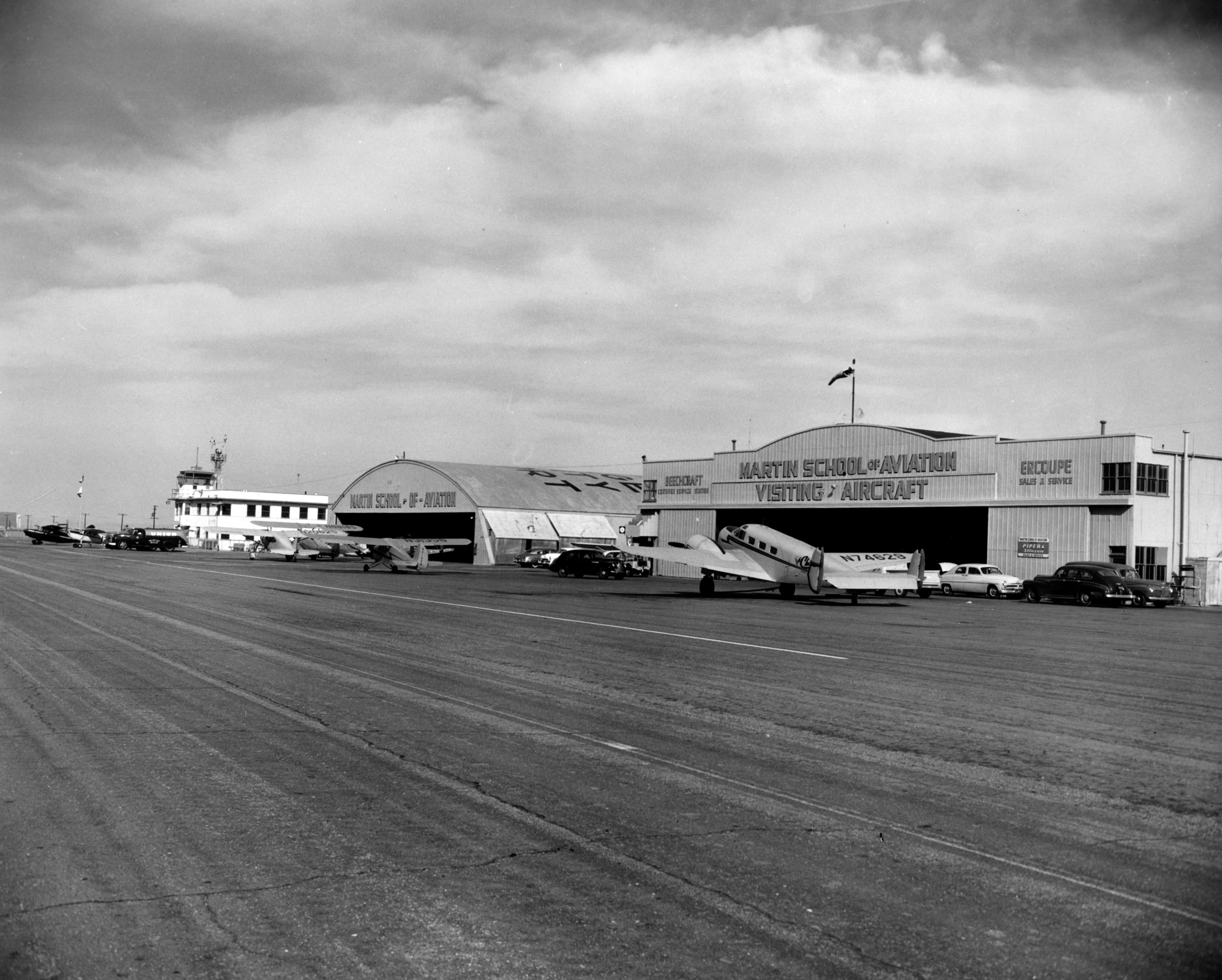
Orange County Airport, the 1950s

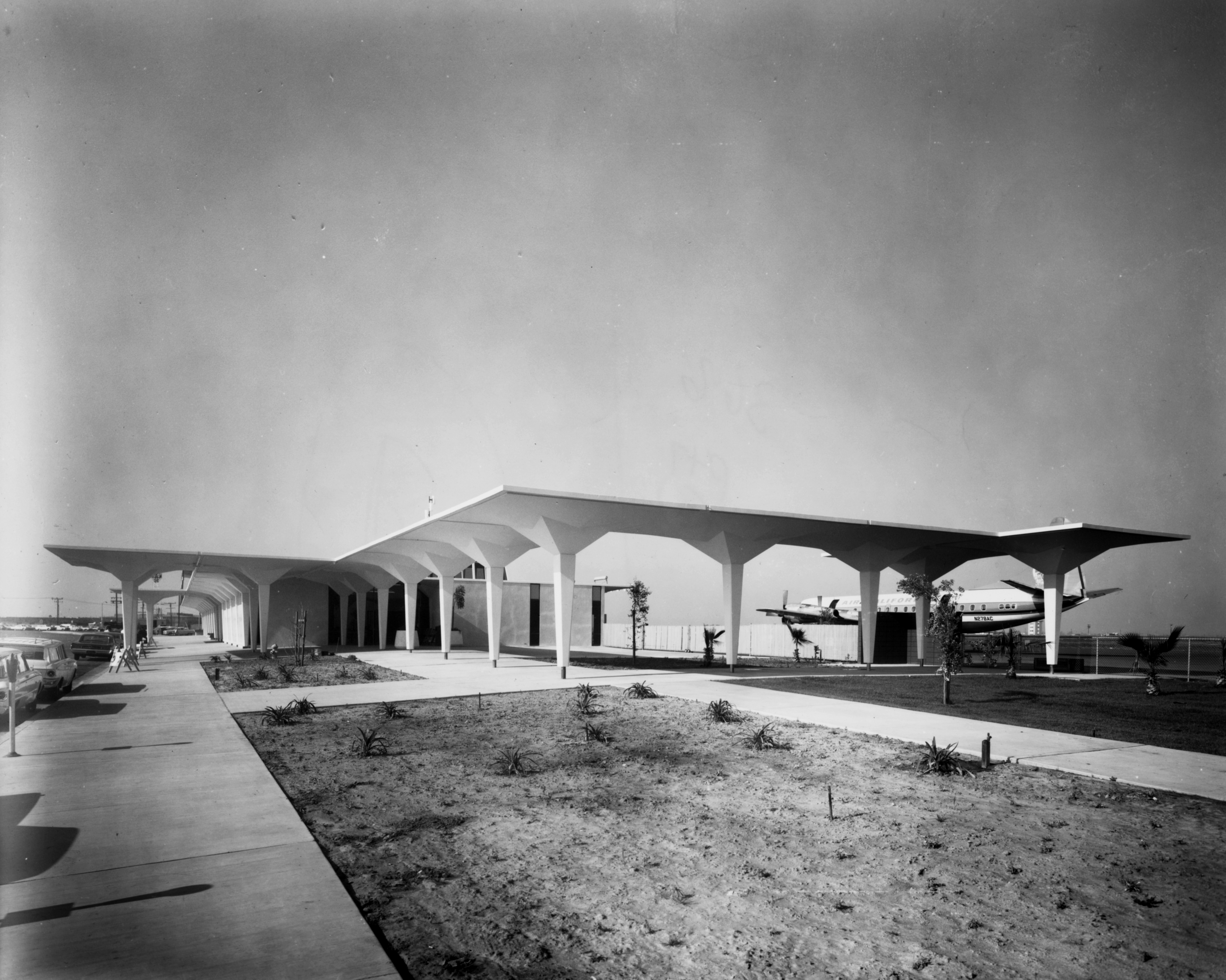
Orange County Airport terminal, circa 1967

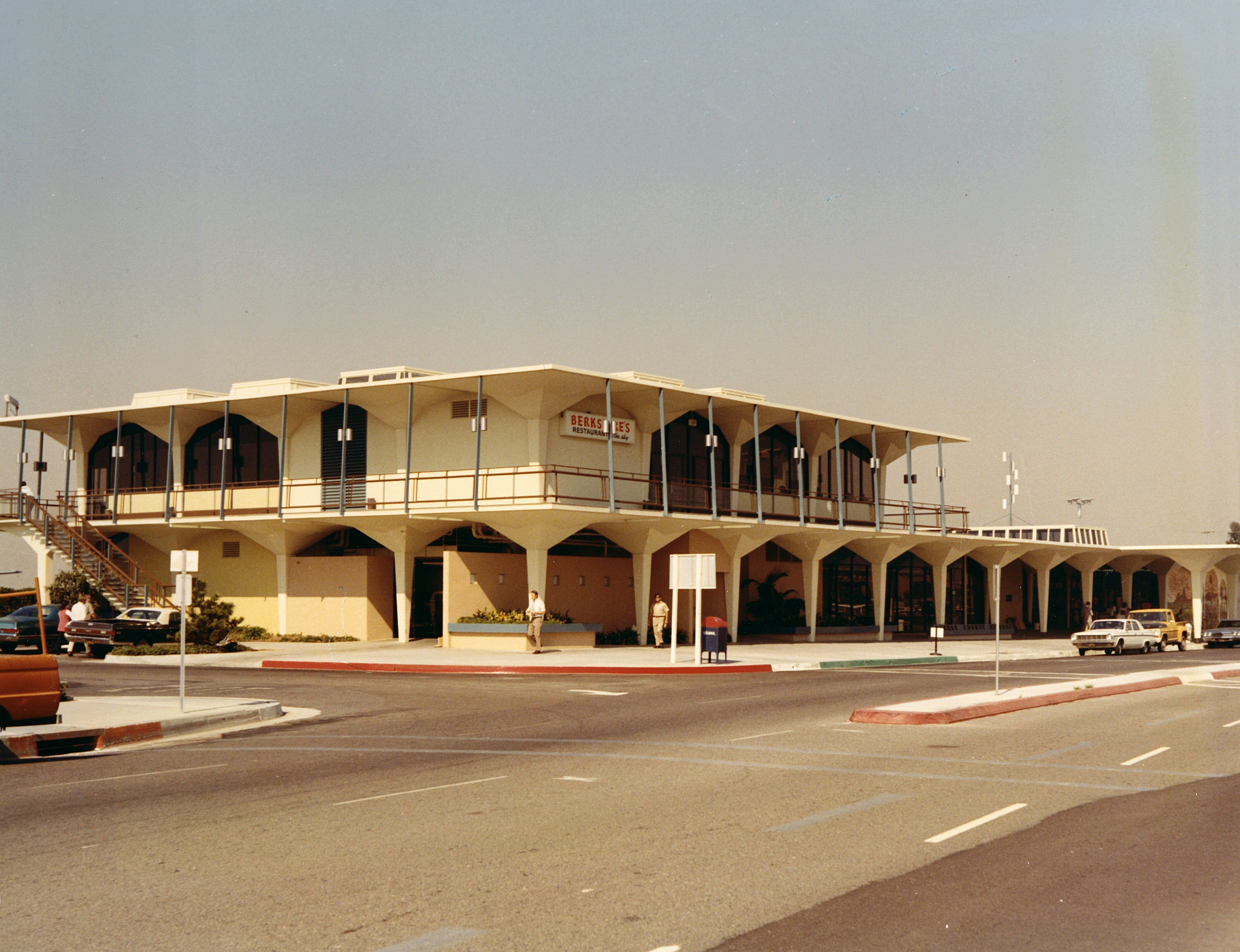
Orange County Airport terminal, 1971

The first airstrip in the area was constructed in 1923, when Eddie Martin signed a five-year lease with James Irvine to operate a flying school on land that used to be part of Rancho Santiago de Santa Ana and Rancho San Joaquin, which were owned by the Irvine Company. It was purchased through a land swap by the County of Orange in 1939 and remains under the county's ownership and management.

Martin added the first hangar to his airfield in 1926. In 1935 Howard Hughes staged his world speed record-setting flight from the Eddie Martin Airport. At some point between 1940 and 1941, the new Orange County Airport was established on land adjacent to Martin Field, to the south. Martin Field closed shortly thereafter.

The facility was used as part of the Santa Ana Army Air Base during World War II, after which it was returned by the federal government to the county with the stipulation that it remain open to all kinds of aviation uses.

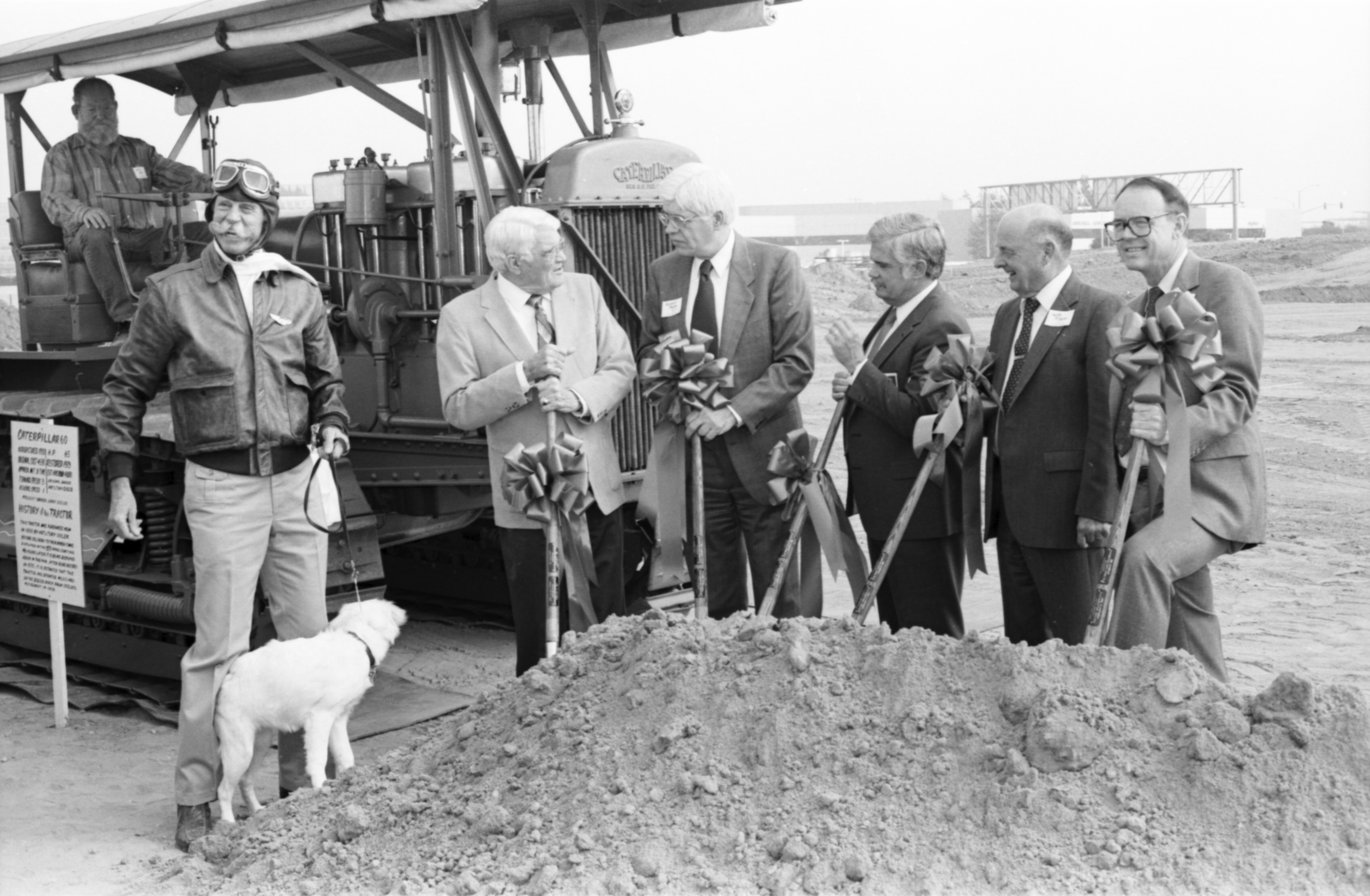
Terminal groundbreaking, October 1988

In addition to continuing to serve aviation, the field became an important drag racing center. From 1950 to 1959, C.J. "Pappy" Hart and Creighton Hunter operated the Santa Ana Drag Strip, credited for being the world's first commercial drag strip, on the airport runway every Sunday, when it was closed to air traffic.

The original single runway was 4,800 feet (1,500 m) long, on a magnetic heading of 210 degrees (Runway 21) and 30 degrees (Runway 3). In 1964 the airport was rebuilt, with its present two parallel runway configuration, oriented 190/10 degrees magnetic. The longer runway, 19R (now 20R), at 5,701 feet (1,738 m), is only 901 feet (275 m) longer than the old Runway 21 but long enough to accommodate jet airliners. A full instrument landing system (ILS) was also installed.

In the 1950s, the only airline flights were Bonanza's few flights between Los Angeles and Phoenix, via San Diego. In 1963 Bonanza started nonstop F27s to Phoenix, and to Las Vegas in 1965; in 1967 Air California started Electra nonstops to San Francisco, 48 flights a week each way. The first scheduled jet flights were Bonanza DC-9s later in 1967. From 1967 through 1980, Air California (later renamed AirCal) and Bonanza and its successors, Air West and Hughes Airwest, had a duopoly at the airport, until the FAA ruled this illegal.

In 1967, the 22,000-square-foot (2,000 m^{2}) Eddie Martin Terminal, designed by William L. Pereira & Associates, was built to accommodate 400,000 annual passengers. Remodeling added two passenger holding areas in 1974, a new baggage claim area in 1980 and a terminal annex building in 1982, bringing the facility to 29,000 square feet (2,700 m^{2}).

Nonstop flights reached Salt Lake City in 1976–77 (Hughes DC-9s), Denver in 1982 (Frontier MD-80s), Dallas/Fort Worth in 1983 (American MD-80s), Chicago–O'Hare in 1986 (AirCal 737-300s), and New York–Kennedy in 1991 (America West 757-200s).

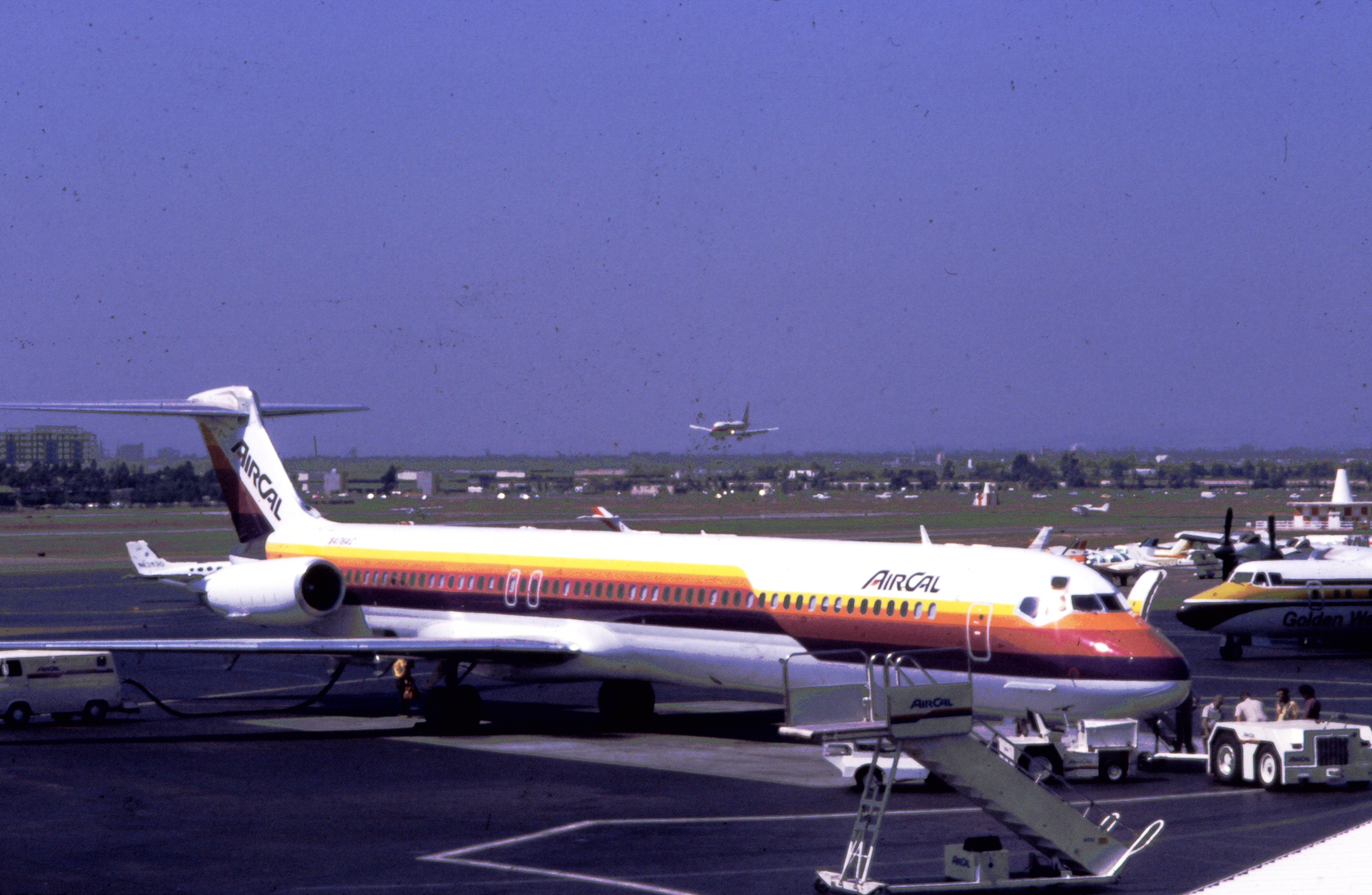
AirCal MD-80 jet at John Wayne Airport, 1981

After the Orange County Airport was renamed John Wayne Airport on June 20, 1979, the John Wayne Associates commissioned sculptor Robert Summers to create a bronze statue of "the Duke". The 9-foot (2.7 m) statue, created at Hoka Hey Foundry in Dublin, Texas, was dedicated to the County on November 4, 1982. Today, the bronze statue is in the Thomas F. Riley Terminal on the Arrival Level.

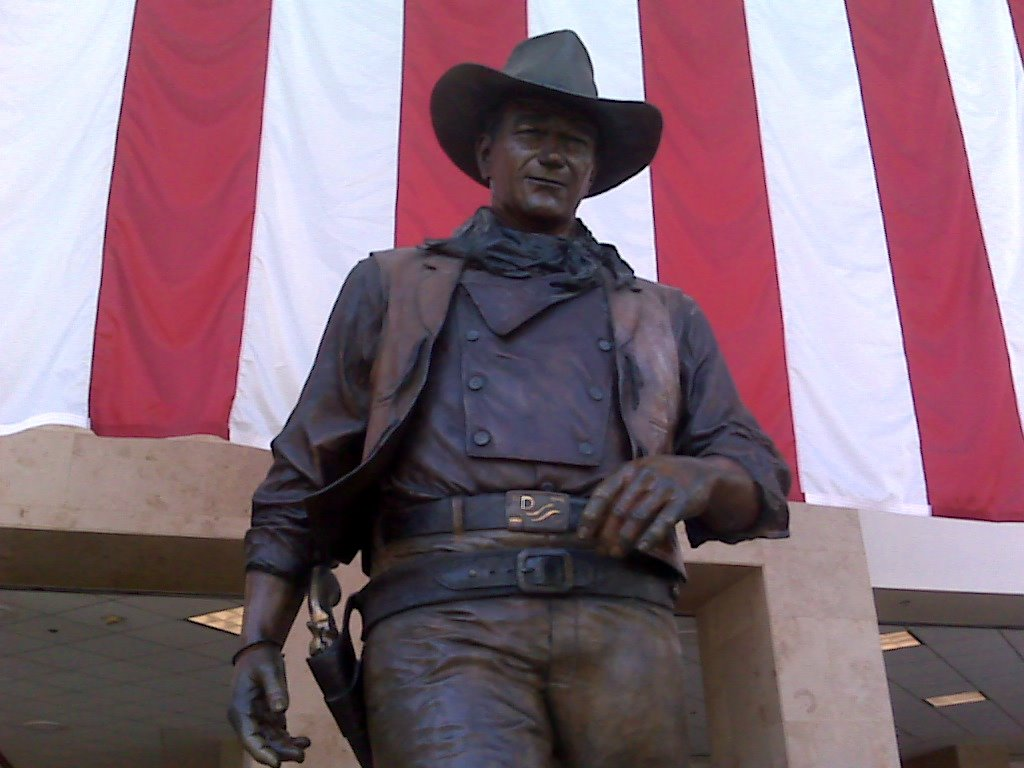
The bronze statue of John Wayne in the airport's main lobby, 2009

In 1990, the Thomas F. Riley Terminal opened. The aging 29,000-square-foot (2,700 m^{2}) Eddie Martin Terminal was replaced with a modern 337,900-square-foot (31,390 m^{2}) facility. The new facility included 14 loading bridges, four baggage carousels, wide-open spaces and distinct roadside arrival and departure levels. In 1994, the then-unused Eddie Martin Terminal was demolished. In the late 1990s and early 2000s, a new, larger airport was proposed for the nearby site of the then recently closed El Toro Marine Corps Air Station. However, after a series of political battles, combined with significant opposition from residents in the vicinity of El Toro, the proposal was defeated, and no new airport was built.

In 2011, additional terminal space was added and existing terminals were refreshed as part of a $543 million expansion project. A new Terminal C with six additional gates was built along with dedicated commuter gate areas in the new Terminal C and new commuter facilities in Terminal A. A new parking lot C was added along with additional support facilities such as a Central Utility plant.

In June 2020, following the murder of George Floyd, the change of the airport's name back to Orange County Airport was demanded by activists, due to comments the actor had made in support of white supremacy in a 1971 Playboy interview.

In September 2020, Orange County officials announced they planned to end all of carrier JSX operations at the airport on January 1, 2021, stating it is "no longer welcomed" [sic]. Following the announcement, the airline sought support from its customers, encouraging them to contact the Orange County officials and demand that the airline is allowed to continue operations at John Wayne. In December 2020, the airline filed a lawsuit stating that the airport has "refused to offer any accommodations" to JSX and "discriminatorily chose" to terminate the airline's operations at John Wayne "in favor of two large airlines [Spirit and Allegiant Airlines]," of which the former already operates the same flights as JSX to Las Vegas, Reno, and Oakland. Shortly after, the airline won a temporary restraining order that prevented the airport authorities from terminating the airline's operations, with which an airport spokeswoman stated the airport would comply.

== Terminals ==
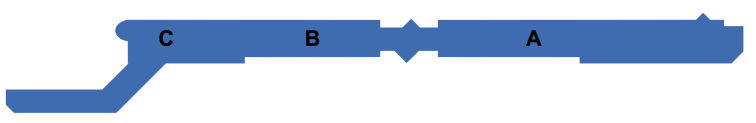
Terminals

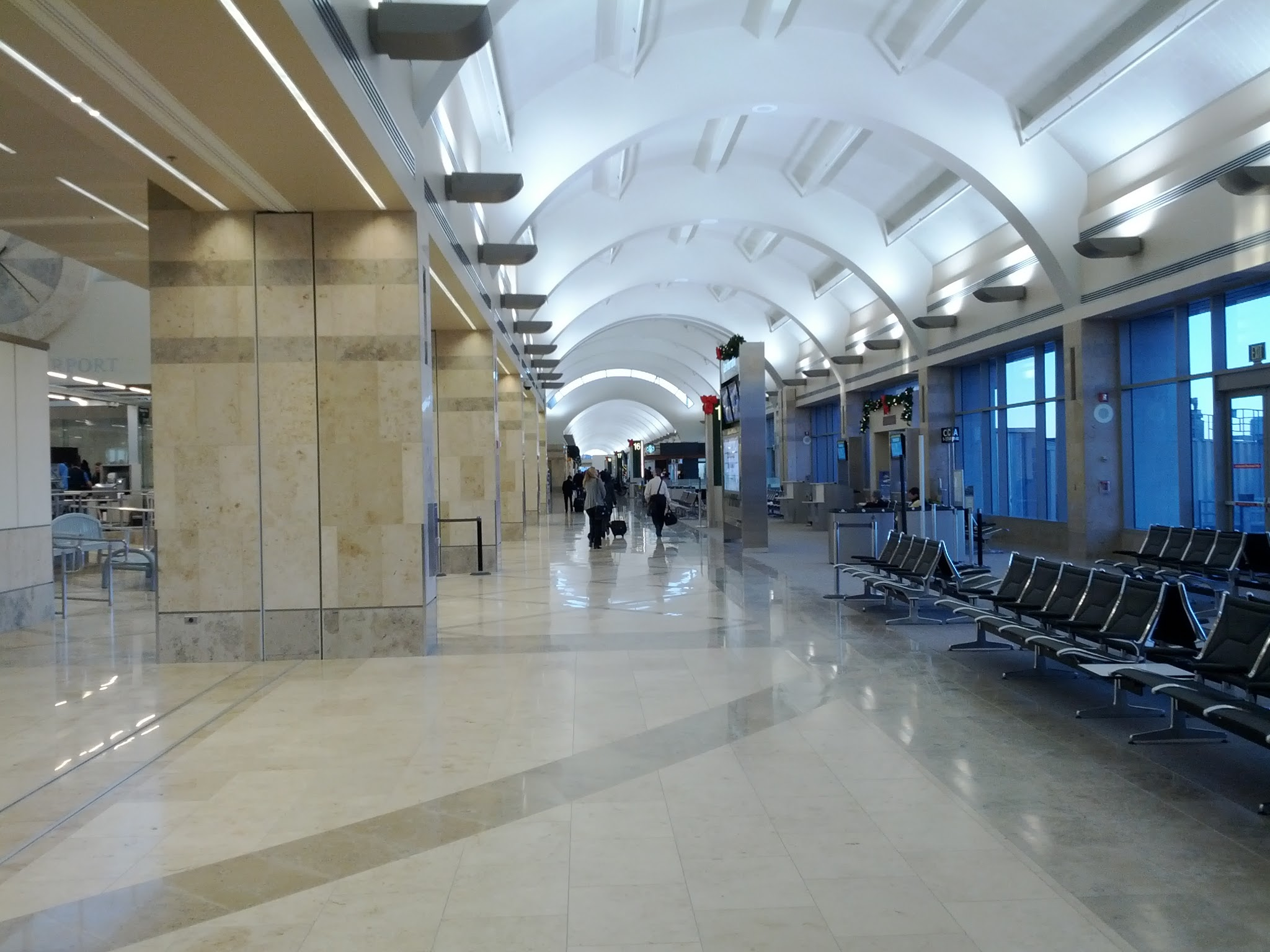
Terminal C gate areas

There are 22 gates in total. The main passenger terminal, the Thomas F. Riley Terminal, is named for the late county supervisor who lobbied for the airport's expansion in the 1980s. The Thomas F. Riley Terminal is divided into three terminal areas, A, B and C, with dedicated commuter gate areas at the north end of Terminal A and south end of Terminal C.

All three terminals, A, B and C, are within the same Thomas F. Riley building and security screened passengers can move "airside" between all terminal areas. Security screening lanes exist in all three terminals adjacent to check-in. All security screening areas also have a "fast track" lane for first-class and elite frequent fliers along with full TSA PreCheck availability based on TSA defined schedules. Switching between terminals indoors before security "landside" is also possible, the check-in counter areas between all three terminals have connecting walkways to allow access between all terminals. Complimentary Wi-Fi is provided in all three terminals.

=== Terminals A and B ===
Terminals A and B were built in 1990 to replace the former Eddie Martin Terminal which was closed upon the new terminals' opening. In November 2011, Terminal A added a dedicated commuter gate area, along with refreshed gates, signage and information displays at both Terminals A and B.

Terminals A and B were designed by Gensler & Associates, Leason Pomeroy Associates, and Thompson Consultants International. They contain restaurants, bars and shops, with a themed restaurant located in the airside connecting area of both terminals. In the upper rotunda above the themed restaurant is an American Airlines Admirals Club (operating out of Terminal A) and a United Club (operating out of Terminal B). The two lounges lie adjacent to each other on the mezzanine level. Terminal A has gates 1–8, and Terminal B has gates 9–15.

=== Terminal C ===
Terminal C opened in November 2011 and added seven new gates, a dedicated commuter gate area and new eateries and retail.

Terminal C also provides a U.S. Customs and Border Protection FIS/Federal Inspection Service for international flights that do not have pre-clearance. Two arrival gates feed into the FIS and passengers once cleared exit at the south end of the Terminal C arrivals area. The FIS facility has Global Entry kiosks for registered users to shorten processing time. The FIS facility was designed by Gensler. Terminal C has gates 16–22.

=== Arrivals level ===
The Arrivals level is on the lower level of the airport and provides seven baggage claim belts, two in Terminal A, two in Terminal B and three in Terminal C. Baggage Claim 7 is for international arrivals. Immediately outside the baggage claim is the curbside arrivals pickup area. Rental car offices are between Terminal A and B baggage claim areas with most rental agencies on-site in the lower levels of the parking facility across the arrivals pickup area between Terminal A and B. Across the roadway from the arrivals pickup area between Terminal A and B is an island for public transportation, including taxis and buses.

== International service ==
John Wayne Airport Control Tower

John Wayne Airport offers international flights to Mexico and Canada. The airport did not have any regularly scheduled international service until 2010 when Air Canada began operations to Toronto, Ontario. Flights from Canada complete immigration and customs formalities in Canada via United States border preclearance.

Southwest Airlines operated international flights to Puerto Vallarta and San José del Cabo in Mexico as of March 11, 2021. Prior to resumption, it previously served flights to Puerto Vallarta from June 18, 2015, until March 2017. Southwest has also served flights to Cabo San Lucas until March 2020, alongside terminating other destinations at the time due to passenger limitations following a 1985 settlement agreement.

Canadian airline WestJet provides non-stop year round service to Vancouver since May 2011. It is also serving direct flights to Calgary; it previously served that route from June 2011 to 2013 before ending operations up until its resumption on November 4, 2021.

Air Canada also provides daily non-stop flights to Vancouver, British Columbia since October 2, 2021. It was set to start flights in June 2020, and then delayed to September 8, 2020, and then to May 2021, which would have marked its return to service to Orange County after 10 years. It previously operated flights to Toronto, Ontario from April 8, 2010, becoming the first-ever international airline to serve Orange County, until it ceased flights later that year.

Alaska Airlines was scheduled for international service to Vancouver in 2002. However, a stop in Seattle (or change of planes) was required shortly after launch as John Wayne Airport was not authorized for pre-clearance or international flights by U.S. agencies at the time.

Southwest Airlines' then-subsidiary AirTran Airways began a new service in June 2012 from John Wayne Airport to Cabo San Lucas and Mexico City. This was the first international service to use the new FIS in Terminal C. After its merger with AirTran was completed in 2014, Southwest continued to operate the Mexico flights under its original brand. However, Southwest then ended its service to Mexico City (MEX) from SNA in January 2017 before completely discontinuing all flights to MEX in March 2019.

Mexico's low-cost carrier Interjet began a new service in October 2012 from Orange County to Guadalajara and Mexico City. It ended both flights in July 2014; the airport officials are seeking a replacement.

Alaska Airlines began a Mexico service in October 2015. The airline began offering non-stop flights from John Wayne Airport to Los Cabos on October 8 and Puerto Vallarta on the following day, October 9. Alaska Airlines has continued this service to each airport on an every-other-day rotation. Since August 2019, the airline has discontinued flights to Mexico.

In 2014, it was reported that airline officials were in negotiations with Mexican low-cost airline Volaris, which applied for an Orange County slot.

In October 2026, it was announced that Aeroméxico will begin operations at Orange County from Mexico City on January 11, 2027, as part of its new US expansion.

== Aircraft noise abatement and curfew ==
A 1985 settlement agreement defined the scope of operation for John Wayne Airport in how it affects the local community. The area that lies directly south of John Wayne Airport is considered a noise-sensitive area. The agreement in conjunction with a Phase 2 Commercial Airline Access Plan and Regulation controls the number of noisier operations (mainly commercial aircraft) allowed from the airport. Noise abatement enforcement is carried out with the aid of 10 permanent noise monitoring stations. These stations are placed in areas that exceed a Community Noise Equivalent Level (CNEL) of 65 dB. Noise reports are published by the airport and are available to the public.

Commercial traffic during morning curfew just before the 7am departure hold release

The takeoff procedure at John Wayne Airport is unique because of the local noise restrictions and short runway. When using the typical traffic pattern (departures from runway 20R) most commercial airliners cycle to full power (95–97%) while holding at the end of the runway then release the brakes when engines are fully spooled up. Pilots must make a steep 25 degree climb to 500 to 700 feet (150–210 m), where engine power is reduced to reduce noise. Pilots must also make a left turn after departure to 175 degrees to enter a corridor over the city of Newport Beach where the noise was deemed to be the least disruptive. These procedures have led passengers to rate John Wayne Airport as one of the nation's scariest. The takeoff has been described as one from an aircraft carrier, hence the airport's nickname USS John Wayne.

Departures from 2L (normally during Santa Ana wind conditions) are not affected by these noise abatement procedures. Landings are also typically on runway 20R and almost always include full flap extensions and the use of full reverse thrust. Extension of the runway is almost impossible, as both ends are bounded by freeways along with numerous residences and businesses.

The county prohibits commercial departures between 10:00 PM and 7:00 AM (8:00 AM on Sundays) and commercial arrivals between 11:00 PM and 7:00 AM (8:00 AM on Sundays). Exceptions can be made for an emergency, mechanical, air traffic control, or weather delay, which is beyond the airline's control. Curfew exceptions by carrier are published by the airport and are available to the public.

=== Settlement amendments ===
In 2003, the settlement agreement was amended to increase operations but only for aircraft meeting the lowest noise signatures. The amendment increased the annual passenger limit to 10.8 million, up from the original 8.4-million limit.

In 2014, the Orange County Board of Supervisors set the airport restrictions for 2021 at 11.8 million passengers per year. This limit was to be an increase from 10.8 million annual passengers previously.

In 2026, the annual passenger limit is expected to increase to 12.2 or 12.5 million through 2030. The higher limit will be allowed only if the number of passengers reaches 95% of the annual limit in each year between 2021 and 2025.

== Airlines and destinations ==
=== Passenger ===
The following airlines offer scheduled passenger service. All international arrivals (excluding flights from destinations with U.S. border preclearance) are processed in Terminal C. JSX operates from space within the ACI Jet building, an adjacent separate facility from the main passenger terminal.

Airlines	Destinations	Refs
Aeroméxico	Mexico City–Benito Juárez (begins January 11, 2027)	
Air Canada	Vancouver	
Alaska Airlines	Boise, Everett, Portland (OR), San Francisco, Santa Rosa, Seattle/Tacoma, Spokane; Seasonal: Tucson	
Allegiant Air	Appleton, Boise, Cincinnati, Colorado Springs, Eugene, Grand Rapids, Idaho Falls, Medford, Missoula, Phoenix/Mesa, Provo, Tri-Cities (WA); Seasonal: Des Moines	
American Airlines	Charlotte, Chicago–O'Hare, Dallas/Fort Worth, New York–JFK, Phoenix–Sky Harbor	
Breeze Airways	Las Vegas, Ogden, Provo; Seasonal: Columbus–Glenn, Grand Junction, Montrose, Orlando, Raleigh/Durham	
Delta Air Lines	Atlanta, Detroit, Minneapolis/St. Paul, New York–JFK, Salt Lake City, Seattle/Tacoma	
Delta Connection	Salt Lake City, Seattle/Tacoma	
Frontier Airlines	Denver, Las Vegas, Phoenix–Sky Harbor, Salt Lake City, San Francisco	
JSX	Las Vegas, Reno/Tahoe, Scottsdale; Seasonal: Concord (CA), Monterey, Napa	
Southwest Airlines	Austin, Dallas–Love, Denver, Las Vegas, Oakland, Phoenix–Sky Harbor, Puerto Vallarta, Sacramento, San Jose (CA), San José del Cabo; Seasonal: Nashville	
United Airlines	Chicago–O'Hare, Denver, Houston–Intercontinental, Newark, San Francisco, Washington–Dulles	
United Express	San Francisco	
WestJet	Calgary	

== Runways ==
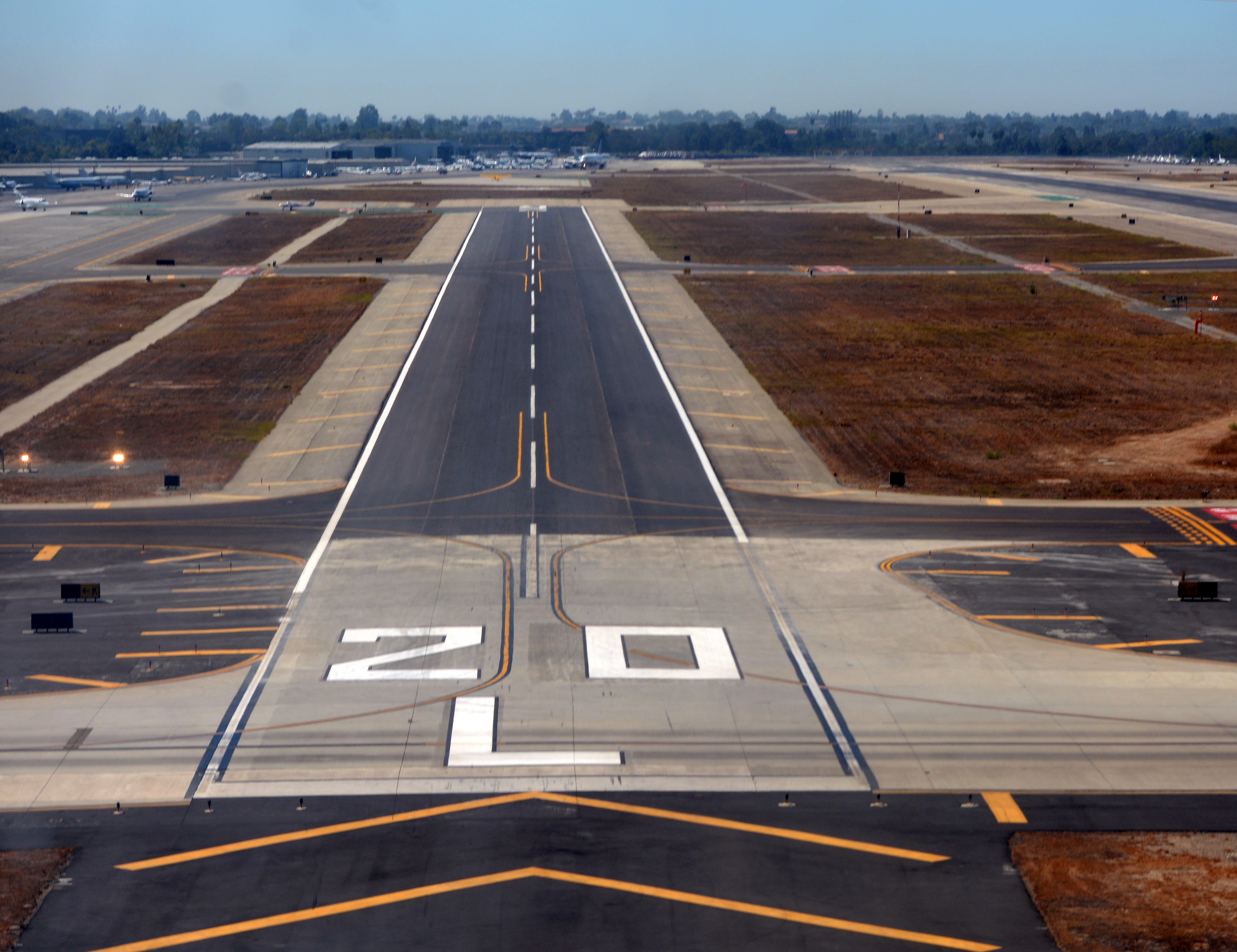
The shorter runway 20L at SNA, circa 2014

John Wayne Airport covers 504 acres (204 ha). The airport has multiple general aviation facilities, an airline concourse building split into three terminal areas, and 2 paved runways.

- Runway 2L/20R: 5,700 by 150 feet (1,737 m × 46 m), used by commercial aircraft and general aviation serving most incoming and departing traffic to the west of the airport. This runway is ILS equipped.
- Runway 2R/20L: 2,886 by 75 feet (880 m × 23 m), used by smaller general aviation aircraft and light aircraft.

== General aviation ==
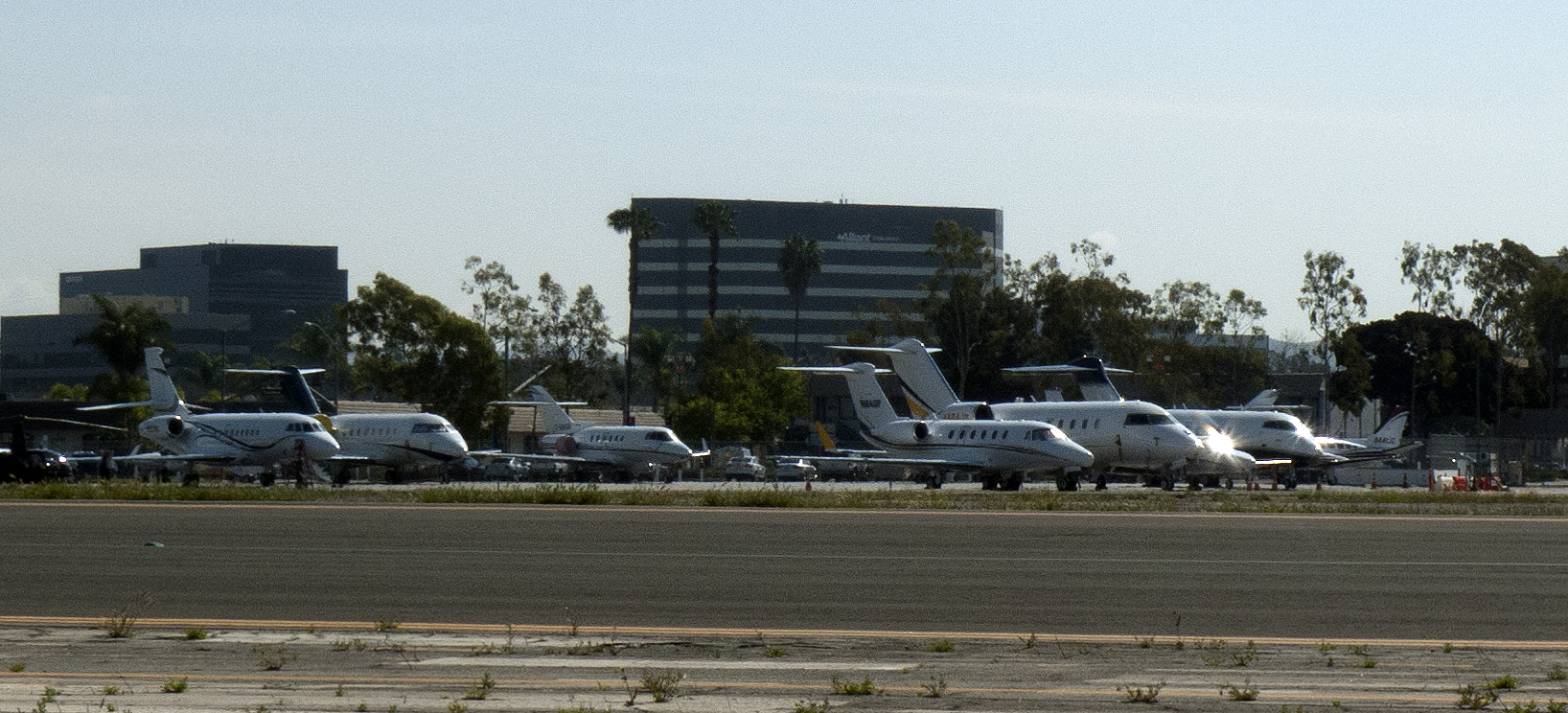
Private jets on the apron at John Wayne Airport at Atlantic Aviation

ACI Jet, North Hangar facility

The airport is the home base for approximately 450 general aviation aircraft.
The General Aviation Master Plan adopted in the early 1990s limits John Wayne Airport to two FBOs (fixed-base operator). Effective January 1, 2021, these two fixed-base operators are Clay Lacy Aviation and ACI Jet. In addition to supporting fuel sales and other aircraft services, these companies lease facilities to flight training, charter, and aircraft maintenance businesses.

- FBOs:
  ACI Jet
  Clay Lacy Aviation
- Airport businesses
  Clay Lacy Aviation
  Martin Aviation Aircraft Maintenance
  HeliStream
  OC Helicopters
  Orange County Flight Center
  Regency Air
  Sunrise Aviation
  Western Avionics

== Law enforcement operations ==
=== Orange County Sheriff's Department ===
OCSD Duke 6 Bell UH 1H N186SD

John Wayne Airport has been the main base for the Orange County Sheriff's Department's Air Support Unit since 1985 when the county's board of supervisors approved the purchase of two Hughes MD 500E aircraft nicknamed "Duke I" and "Duke II". In 1998, the OCSD traded their MD 500E helicopters for newer McDonnell Douglas MD 600N helicopters, becoming the first law enforcement agency to operate the MD 600N. These helicopters were faster, quieter, and safer than the MD 500E.

The Air Support Unit currently operates of fleet of Eurocopter AS350 AStar helicopters, with a Bell UH-1 Iroquois used for search and rescue purposes.

=== Costa Mesa Police Department ===
The Costa Mesa Police Department operated an aviation unit out of John Wayne Airport for 41 years. The division was called "ABLE" for Airborne Law Enforcement. ABLE disbanded in 2012; the unit's helicopters at the time of the disbandment were three Eurocopter EC120 Colibris.

== Statistics ==
=== Top destinations ===
Busiest domestic routes from SNA (June 2025 – May 2026)
Rank	City	Passengers	Carriers
1	Phoenix–Sky Harbor, Arizona	578,464	American, Frontier, Southwest
2	Denver, Colorado	485,967	Frontier, Southwest, United
3	Las Vegas, Nevada	463,712	Delta, Frontier, Southwest, Spirit
4	Seattle/Tacoma, Washington	457,899	Alaska, Delta
5	Dallas/Fort Worth, Texas	402,362	American
6	San Francisco, California	386,684	Alaska, United
7	Chicago–O'Hare, Illinois	323,832	American, United
8	Oakland, California	251,708	Southwest, Spirit
9	San Jose, California	240,957	Alaska, Southwest
10	Sacramento, California	224,244	Southwest

Busiest international routes from SNA (June 2025 – May 2026)
Rank	City	Passengers	Carriers
1	Vancouver, Canada	85,199	Air Canada
2	San José del Cabo, Mexico	76,735	Southwest
3	Calgary, Canada	47,024	Westjet
4	Puerto Vallarta, Mexico	43,743	Southwest

=== Airline market share ===
Largest airlines at SNA (June 2025 – May 2026)
Rank	Airline	Passengers	Share
1	Southwest Airlines	3,263,909	29.2%
2	American Airlines	1,888,768	16.9%
3	United Airlines	1,742,700	15.6%
4	Alaska Airlines	1,650,461	14.8%
5	Delta Air Lines	1,178,962	10.6%
	Other Airlines	1,447,787	13.0%

=== Annual traffic ===
Annual passenger traffic (enplaned + deplaned) at SNA
Year	Passengers	Change	Year	Passengers	Change	Year	Passengers	Change	Year	Passengers	Change
1990	4,586,596	--	2000	7,772,801	▲4.0%	2010	8,663,452	▼0.5%	2020	3,794,850	▼64.4%
1991	5,345,284	▲16.5%	2001	7,324,557	▼5.8%	2011	8,609,008	▼0.6%	2021	7,700,489	▲30.8%
1992	5,672,603	▲6.1%	2002	7,903,066	▲7.9%	2012	8,857,944	▲2.9%	2022	11,360,839	▲47.5%
1993	6,141,981	▲8.3%	2003	8,535,130	▲8.0%	2013	9,232,789	▲4.2%	2023	11,741,325	▲3.3%
1994	6,773,977	▲10.3%	2004	9,272,394	▲8.6%	2014	9,386,033	▲1.7%	2024	11,089,405	▼5.6%
1995	7,159,154	▲5.7%	2005	9,627,032	▲3.8%	2015	10,180,258	▲8.5%	2025	11,369,865	▲2.5%
1996	7,307,750	▲2.1%	2006	9,613,480	▼0.1%	2016	10,496,511	▲4.6%	2026		
1997	7,718,415	▲5.6%	2007	9,979,699	▲3.8%	2017	10,423,578	▼0.7%	2027		
1998	7,460,179	▼3.3%	2008	8,989,603	▼9.9%	2018	10,664,038	▲2.3%	2028		
1999	7,470,415	▲0.1%	2009	8,705,199	▼3.2%	2019	10,656,986	▼0.1%	2029		

== Ground transportation ==
=== Roads and highways ===
John Wayne Airport is located next to the interchange between I-405 (San Diego Freeway) and MacArthur Boulevard. The airport is also near I-405's interchange with SR 55 (Costa Mesa Freeway). Heading south on MacArthur Boulevard from the airport provides access to SR 73 (Corona del Mar Freeway), which becomes the San Joaquin Hills Transportation Corridor (toll road) southeast of MacArthur Boulevard.

=== Bus ===
The airport is served by Orange County Transportation Authority ("OCTA") route 76, which runs only on weekdays from 6 am to 6 pm.

=== Car rental ===
On-site car rentals are available in the basement level of the Parking A2/B2 garages. Off-site car rental shuttles are available at the Ground Transportation Center.

=== Parking ===
The airport has four parking garages open in the main terminal area: A1, A2, B2 and C. Valet parking is available between at a drop off/pick up area Terminals A and B, and between Terminals B and C. An off-airport parking lot (Main Street Parking) is also available at 1512 Main Street in Irvine, with free shuttle service to the terminals.

=== Taxis and private shuttles ===
Taxis and private shuttles are available from the Ground Transportation Center located outside the lower level between Terminal A and B.

=== Transportation network companies ===
Transportation network companies, Lyft, Uber and Wingz, are available. Drop-offs can be made at the departure level outside each terminal; pickups are allowed only in designated parking structure areas assigned for pickups for transportation network companies (No pickups are allowed on the arrivals or departures level.)

== Accidents and incidents ==
John Wayne Airport Fire Department

On February 17, 1981, Air California (AirCal) Flight 336 (a Boeing 737-200), with 105 passengers and five crew members, was flying from San Jose, to John Wayne Airport and crashed upon initiating a go-around. The crew was cleared for a visual approach to Runway 19R while the controller had cleared a smaller plane to take off from 19R. Upon realizing that the landing aircraft might overtake the departing one, the controller ordered the flight to go around and the other aircraft to abort its takeoff, which it did. The captain of the landing Air California aircraft delayed the go-around then initiated a gear up procedure before a positive rate of climb was achieved, causing the plane to stall. The 737 then banked left at low altitude causing the left wingtip to make contact with the runway. Then the nose came down, striking the ground, and the airplane spun around and skidded down the runway before coming to rest in the margin. A fire started, but the passengers and crew exited the plane. Of the passengers, four sustained serious injuries, and 29 suffered minor injuries. The aircraft, registered N468AC, was damaged beyond repair and was written off.

On December 15, 1993, a chartered IAI Westwind business jet carrying two flight crew members and three passengers (including Rich Snyder, president of In-N-Out Burger), crashed while on approach to John Wayne Airport. All five occupants were killed in the crash. The aircraft, which departed Brackett Field, 30 miles to the north in La Verne, followed a Boeing 757 for landing, became caught in the 757's wake turbulence, rolled into a deep descent, and crashed near the intersection of State Route 55 and Edinger Avenue. The crash investigation led to the FAA requirement for an adequate period between heavy aircraft and following light aircraft to allow wake turbulence to diminish.

On February 13, 2017, Harrison Ford accidentally landed his Aviat Husky on taxiway C, to the left of runway 20L. A Boeing 737 was holding short of 20L on the taxiway when Ford overflew them.

On June 30, 2017, a Cessna 310 twin-engine aircraft crashed short of a runway into a highway median on Interstate 405. The pilot made a mayday call shortly after taking off from John Wayne Airport and attempted to land after being cleared for emergency landing on runway 20R. Two people on board were injured in the crash.

On August 5, 2018, a Cessna 414 scheduled to land at John Wayne Airport crashed into a Staples parking lot a few blocks north of the airport in nearby Santa Ana, killing at least five people.

On January 26, 2020, a Sikorsky S-76B helicopter took off from John Wayne Airport at approximately 9:06 am PST carrying retired NBA basketball player Kobe Bryant along with his 13-year-old daughter Gianna, college baseball coach John Altobelli and six others bound for Camarillo Airport for a basketball event in Thousand Oaks. En route, the helicopter crashed into a hillside in Calabasas south of U.S. Route 101, killing all nine people on board on impact. The helicopter had been seen in distress under heavy fog, according to witnesses. The cause of the crash was pilot error and spatial disorientation.

On the evening of August 20, 2021, an unauthorized person bypassed security and gained access to the tarmac near Terminal C, prompting a lockdown of the airport. The suspect took control of a ground crew vehicle and drove it around before abandoning it and re-entering the terminal. Police later discovered the suspect hiding in an attic space inside the terminal and took him into custody.

== Lyon Air Museum ==
Lyon Air Museum, founded by Major General William Lyon in 2009, is located in a hangar on the west side of the airport. It focuses particularly on World War II military aircraft and vehicles. The air museum features a rotating selection of antique cars from General Lyon's personal collection every year for a limited time. Past features include a collection of the General's Duesenbergs and Packard collections. The museum also hosted the Collings Foundation's annual flight experience program every spring, allowing the public the opportunity to fly in a historic Boeing B-17 Flying Fortress or Consolidated B-24 Liberator, until that program was terminated in 2020 by the Federal Aviation Administration following the fatal 2019 crash of the Foundation's B-17 in Windsor Locks, Connecticut.

== Climate ==
The area around John Wayne Airport has a warm-summer Mediterranean climate (Csb) characteristic of coastal Southern California.

Climate data for John Wayne Airport, California (normals 1981–2010) (extremes 1999–2020)
Month	Jan	Feb	Mar	Apr	May	Jun	Jul	Aug	Sep	Oct	Nov	Dec	Year
Record high °F (°C)	90 (32)	90 (32)	95 (35)	99 (37)	99 (37)	96 (36)	99 (37)	100 (38)	110 (43)	106 (41)	100 (38)	90 (32)	110 (43)
Mean daily maximum °F (°C)	66.5 (19.2)	66.3 (19.1)	67.3 (19.6)	69.0 (20.6)	71.7 (22.1)	73.6 (23.1)	77.9 (25.5)	80 (27)	79.3 (26.3)	75.2 (24.0)	71 (22)	65.9 (18.8)	72 (22)
Daily mean °F (°C)	56.7 (13.7)	57.4 (14.1)	59.4 (15.2)	61.4 (16.3)	65 (18)	67.3 (19.6)	71.1 (21.7)	72.6 (22.6)	71.5 (21.9)	67 (19)	61.6 (16.4)	56.1 (13.4)	63.9 (17.7)
Mean daily minimum °F (°C)	47 (8)	48.6 (9.2)	51.5 (10.8)	53.9 (12.2)	58.3 (14.6)	61 (16)	64.4 (18.0)	65.3 (18.5)	63.8 (17.7)	58.7 (14.8)	52.1 (11.2)	46.2 (7.9)	55.9 (13.3)
Record low °F (°C)	33 (1)	36 (2)	41 (5)	41 (5)	49 (9)	54 (12)	57 (14)	58 (14)	56 (13)	46 (8)	37 (3)	36 (2)	33 (1)
Average precipitation inches (mm)	2.91 (74)	2.95 (75)	1.9 (48)	0.89 (23)	0.23 (5.8)	0.08 (2.0)	0.04 (1.0)	0.03 (0.76)	0.22 (5.6)	0.75 (19)	1.25 (32)	2.08 (53)	13.33 (339)
Source: NOAA

== See also ==
- California World War II Army Airfields
- Santa Ana Drags
