= Michel Leclercq =

French entrepreneur

- Born: 1938 or 1939 (age 86–87)
- Occupation: Businessman
- Known for: Founder and 40% owner of Decathlon
- Spouse: Marie-Claude Leclercq
- Children: 4, including Olivier Leclercq
- Relatives: Gérard Mulliez (cousin)

Michel Leclercq (born 1938/39) is a French businessman best known as the founder of Decathlon, one of the world’s largest sporting goods retailers.

== Early life ==
Leclercq was born in France. His cousin, Gérard Mulliez, is the founder of the Auchan supermarket chain, and owns 40% of Decathlon.

== Career ==
Leclercq founded Decathlon, a sporting goods retailer, in 1976.

As of December 2017, Forbes estimated his net worth at US$5.1 billion.

== Personal life ==
He is married, has four children, and lives in Lille, France.

His wife, Marie-Claude Leclercq, is a psychotherapist, and represents the family on the council of the Decathlon Foundation, started in 2005.
