= Lee Cooper =

English clothing and footwear manufacturing company

- Type: Subsidiary
- Industry: Textile, footwear
- Founded: 1908; 118 years ago (as M. Cooper Overalls)
- Founder: Morris Cooper
- Headquarters: Shoreditch, East End, London, England
- Area served: Worldwide
- Products: Jeans, denim t-shirts, sneakers, backpacks, and fanny packs.
- Parent: Iconix Brand Group
- Website: leecooper.com

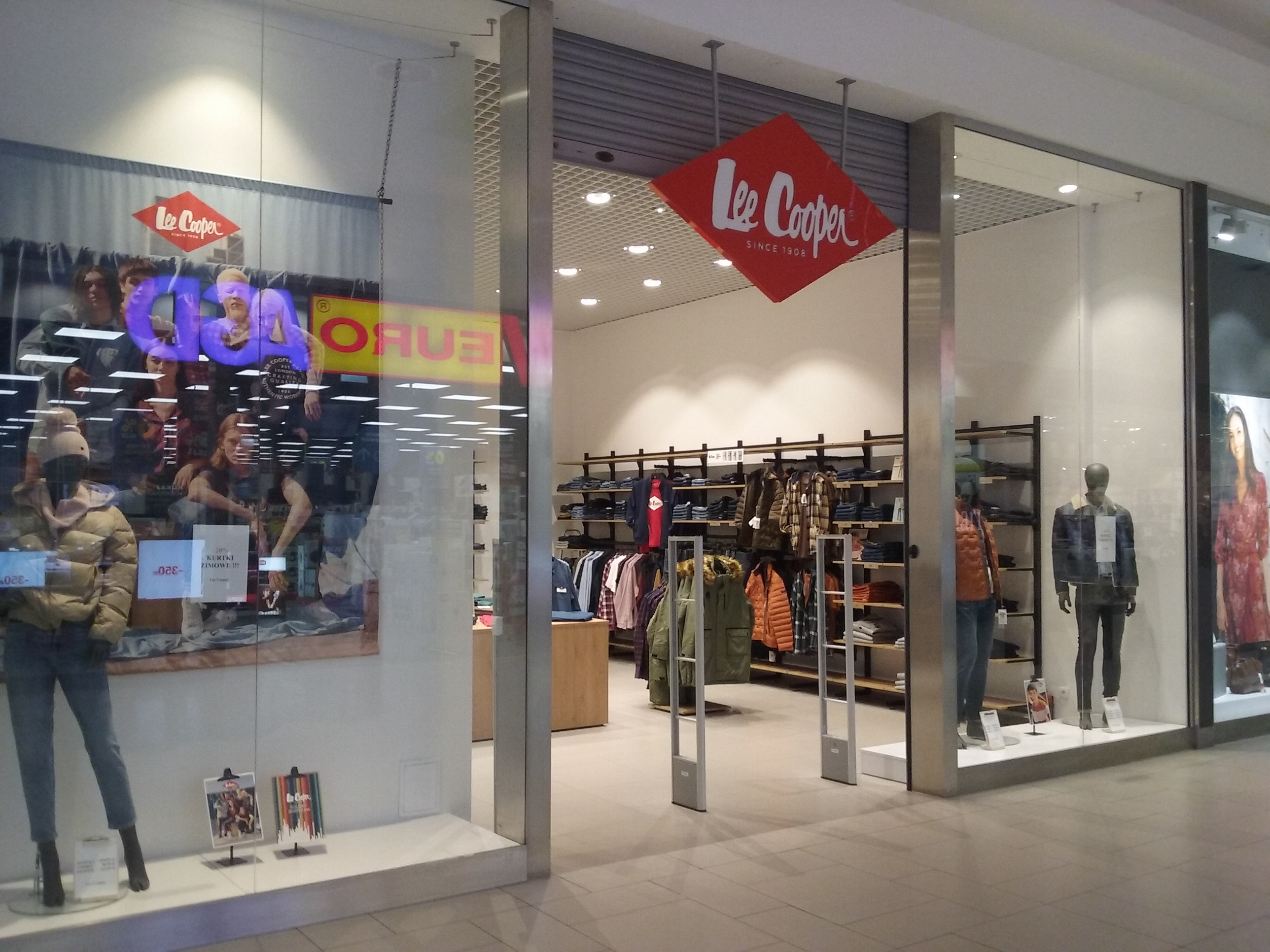
Lee Cooper store in Tomaszów Mazowiecki, Poland

Lee Cooper is an English clothing and footwear manufacturing company, based in Shoreditch, that specialises in denim products. As well as its own production, the company licences the sale of many Lee Cooper-branded items worldwide. Founded as M. Cooper (Overalls) Ltd, the company originally produced workwear for export from England, and began to specialise in denim jackets and trousers in the 1930s. Current products by Lee Cooper include jeans, denim t-shirts, sneakers, backpacks, and fanny packs.

== History ==
=== Early years ===
The company that eventually became Lee Cooper was established in 1908 by Morris Cooper and a friend, Louis Maister, after they arrived in London from their hometown in Lithuania (then part of the Russian Empire), having previously spent some time in South Africa. Operating under the name M. Cooper (Overalls) Ltd, from premises on Middlesex Street (aka Petticoat Lane) in London's East End and centre of the garment industry/rag trade, they began production of workwear, having identified a market for it in South Africa.

During the years of the First World War, M. Cooper (Overalls), which by then employed over 600 people, halted production of workwear and began making uniforms, kit bags and rucksacks for the British Army. In 1937, a new factory dedicated to the manufacture of denim was opened in Stratford, with the business reporting a profit of £1,000 by year end. The outbreak of the Second World War in 1939 led Morris Cooper to split the business into two: one arm continued making workwear, while the other concentrated on producing military uniforms, battle fatigues and flight overalls. M. Cooper (Overalls) eventually became one of the biggest suppliers to the British Armed Forces.

=== Post-war ===
Morris Cooper died in 1940 and his son, Harold Cooper, took over the business upon his return from active service in the RAF. He set about modernising the company and building on its wartime success, switching focus to casual wear and denim production, and taking advantage of the introduction of clothes rationing to increase competitiveness. As part of a re-branding strategy, the company was rechristened, with Harold adding a version of his wife's family name, Leigh, to his own to create "Lee Cooper".

Lee Cooper jeans were adopted by the youth counterculture of the 1950s and 1960s and Harold capitalised on this association by sponsoring a Rolling Stones tour and working with Serge Gainsbourg and Jane Birkin. The company caused a degree of moral outrage in 1953 by introducing the zip-front to women's jeans and commissioned a series of bold publicity campaigns, some of them incorporating fictitious designers such as the Italian 'Alfredo Angelous' in order to appeal to subcultures such as the Mods, who favoured continental style.

The late 1970s saw expansion of production, with the company opening factories in Ireland, France and Tunisia and by the mid 1980s these facilities were producing between 40,000 and 45,000 garments per week. During this time, annual turnover grew to more than £100 million. Lee Cooper was also one of the main pitchside sponsors at the 1984 European Championships in France.

In 1989, the Cooper family sold their majority stake in the business and since then Lee Cooper has become a 'lifestyle' brand, operating in more than seventy markets across the world. In 2008, the company celebrated its centenary.

=== 2000s ===
In 2019, it entered the Bangladesh market through a collaboration with a local company named Express Leather Products.

In 2013, Iconix Brand Group acquired Lee Cooper from Sun Capital Partners.

Pimkie, a woman's fashion chain based in France, decided to sell to three different companies in October of 2022: Lee Cooper to specialize in jeans and denim, a sock manufacturer named Kindy, and a textile supplier in Turkey named Ibisler Tekstil. Lee Cooper France would hold the largest share in the company over Kindy and Ibisler Tekstil.
