= Pimkie =

French clothing retailer in Europe

- Company type: Subsidiary
- Industry: Retail
- Founded: 1971; 55 years ago
- Headquarters: Villeneuve-d'Ascq, France
- Area served: France, Germany, Spain
- Key people: Sandrine Njezic
- Products: Clothing
- Parent: Lee Cooper
- Website: pimkie.com

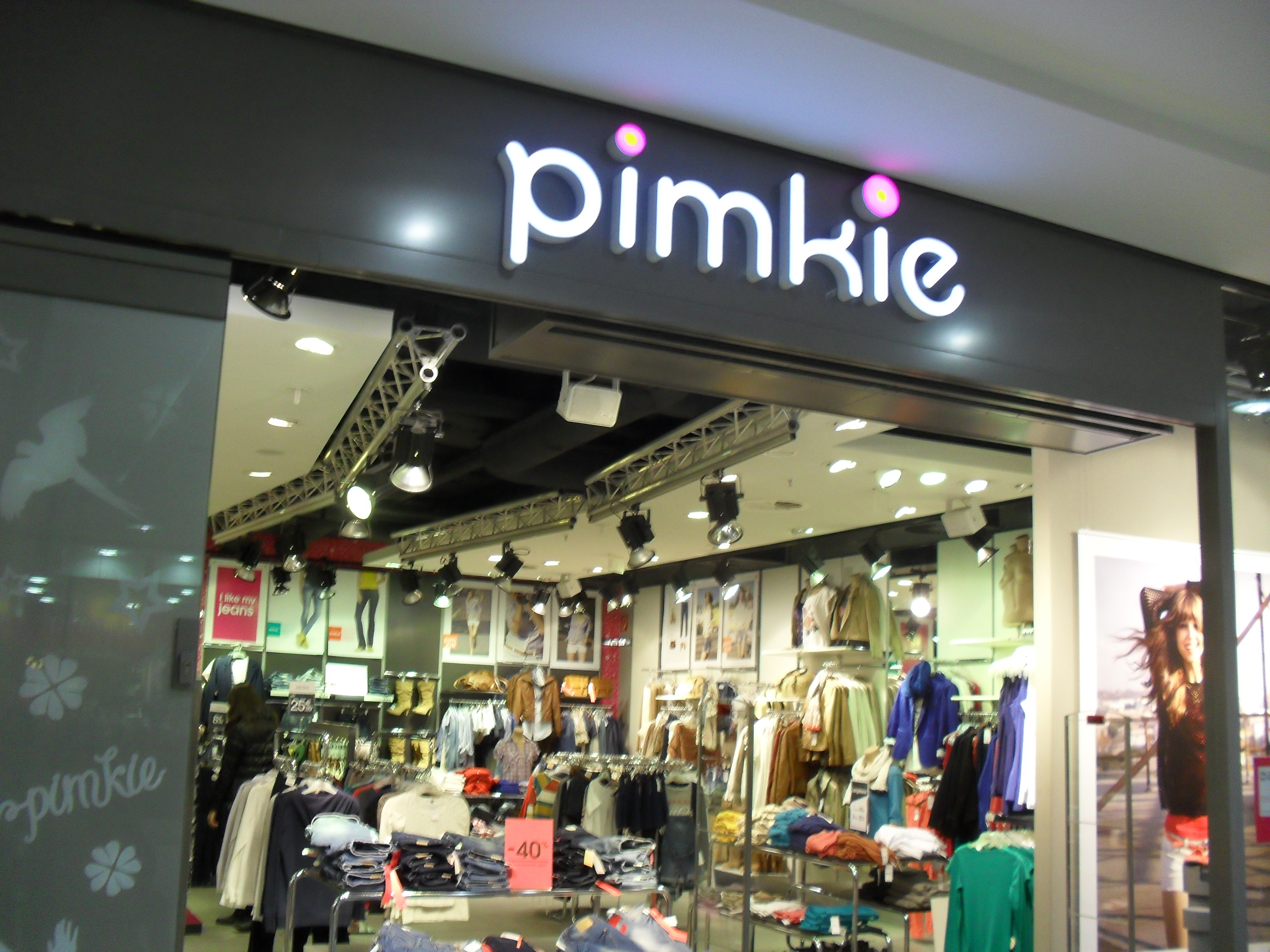
Pimkie store in Leipzig, Germany

Pimkie is a French fast fashion label and chain store for young women. Its headquarters is in Villeneuve-d'Ascq, France. They have offices in Germany and Spain. The first shop was opened in 1971 in Lille.

After a long expansion period, Pimkie reached its peak presence in 2018 with 716 stores in 30 countries, but the company began to face difficulties in the late 2010s. In 2022, a majority share of the company was sold to Lee Cooper.

== History ==
In 1971, French fashion entrepreneurs launched a new trend: pants for women. Thanks to some success, the range was expanded to offer women's ready-to-wear fashions for 15-25 year-olds. Pimkie, then known as Pimckie, opened its first store in Lille during this era.

In 1983, Pimckie became Pimkie. At the end of the 1980s, Pimkie had established itself throughout France with around 100 stores. The brand grew internationally over 20 years. In 2015, the brand expanded its target market from 15-25 year-olds to 18-35 year-olds. By 2018, it had 716 stores in 30 countries, mainly in Europe, five purchasing-sourcing offices (Morocco, Tunisia, Turkey, China, and Hong Kong), one main warehouse in Germany, and five distribution warehouses in Europe.

The company began to face difficulties in late-2010 following a proposed agreement on an indefinite number of contract terminations in France. In 2017, Pimkie announced it would close some 50 stores in Germany and Austria, amid several executive departures. In August 2018, it made 208 people redundant in France and closed 37 stores. In December 2018, Béatrice Lafon was appointed as CEO. The bankruptcy of Pimkie's Belgian and Swiss subsidiaries was announced in 2021, amid management issues and the pandemic.

On 29 March 2023, Pimkie announced a restructuring plan involving the closure of 64 stores over a four-year period and the elimination of 257 positions. Following two redundancy plans implemented in March 2023 and January 2024, the company entered safeguard proceedings in May 2024. On 30 October 2024, the Lille Métropole Commercial Court approved a two-year continuation plan, and Salih Halassi became Pimkie's sole shareholder.

On 16 September 2025, Pimkie signed a partnership agreement with Shein. Under the agreement, Pimkie began offering online collections manufactured by Shein in China and sold under the Pimkie brand. The partnership drew criticism from both employees and the French Federation of Women's Ready-to-Wear Clothing. Some observers argued that the agreement could enable Shein to mitigate the potential impact of proposed French legislation aimed at regulating fast fashion. One month later, Pimkie was expelled from the Fédération des enseignes de l'habillement, the French trade association representing clothing retailers.
