= Flunch =

French multinational restaurant chain

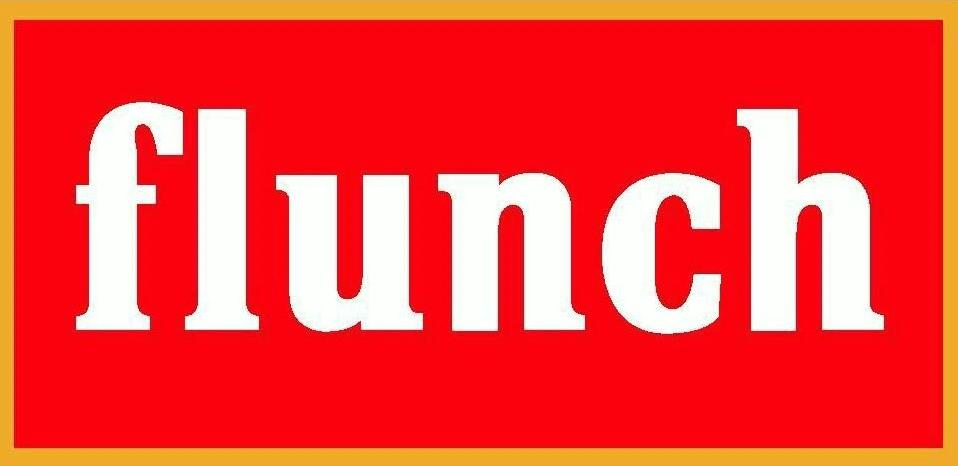
- Type: SAS
- Industry: Restaurant
- Founded: Lille, France (1971; 55 years ago)
- Headquarters: Villeneuve-d'Ascq, France
- Number of locations: over 160
- Area served: France
- Products: Fast casual
- Parent: Agapes Restauration (Association Familiale Mulliez)
- Subsidiaries: Pizza Paï; Amarine; Les 3 Brasseurs; So Good
- Website: flunch.fr

Flunch is a French cafeteria-style fast casual restaurant chain owned by the Agapes Restauration group which belongs to Association Familiale Mulliez group. It operates over 160 locations in France and also 6 in Italy. Flunch restaurants are operated on a self-service basis, whereby customers directly access the food themselves.

== History ==
The first Flunch branch opened in the Englos shopping centre on the outskirts of Lille in 1971.

In 2014, there were approximately 180 restaurants.

In 2018, the company had over 170 restaurants in France and other abroad in Italy, Spain, Portugal, Poland and Russia.

In 2021, the company closed 39 restaurants and sold another 10.

== Slogan ==
- 1997–2004 : On va fluncher
- 1997–1999 : L'appétit vient en flunchant
- 1999–2001 : Vous êtes bien dans notre assiette
- 2004–2007 : Manger varié, c'est bien meilleur pour la santé
- 2007–2009 : Flunch, le plaisir intensément
- 2009–2015 : Fluncher, c'est mieux que manger !
- 2015-2022 : Y'a que chez Flunch qu'on peut fluncher
- Since 2022 : ici, c'est permis

== Controversies ==
In 2006, Flunch lost a legal dispute concerning its use of a modified version of the song ''On va s'aimer'', written by Gilbert Montagné and Didier Barbelivien. The restaurant chain had adapted the refrain with the lyrics ''On va fluncher'' as part of an advertising campaign. The legal proceedings began in 1997 and lasted nine years. After two appeals to the French Court of Cassation, the authors ultimately prevailed on 5 December 2006. The courts based their decision on the principle of the inalienable moral right of authors to respect for the integrity of their work under French copyright law.
