= Gérard Mulliez =

French businessman (born 1931)

- Born: 13 May 1931 (age 95); Roubaix, France
- Known for: Founder, Auchan
- Children: 3
- Relatives: Michel Leclercq (cousin)

Gérard Paul Louis Marie-Joseph Mulliez (born 13 May 1931) is a French entrepreneur and the founder of the Auchan chain of department stores.

== Early life ==
Gérard Mulliez was born on 13 May 1931, in Roubaix, France. His father, Gérard Mulliez, was the owner of Phildar, a knitting yarn brand founded by his grandfather, Louis Mulliez-Lestienne. His uncle, Louis Mulliez, was the owner of the Saint-Liévin factory in Lille. Gérard Mulliez has five siblings.

Mulliez reportedly had bad grades in school. He spent a year in England, where he learned to play rugby and pool and learned to speak English. Despite his efforts, he failed his Baccalaureate.

== Career ==
Mulliez started his career working for his father's company, gradually working his way up until he became its chairman.

In 1961, at the age of twenty-nine, after being inspired by department stores during a trip to the US, he opened his first Auchan store in Roubaix, France. He retired as chairman in 1996 and as CEO in 2006, handing over control to his nephew, Vianney Mulliez.

His holding Association Familiale Mulliez (AFM) controls Auchan as well as a diverse mix of other retail chains such as Leroy Merlin, Decathlon, Saint Maclou, Kiloutou, Kiabi, Flunch, etc. It is co-owned between a thousand family members. Six hundred of his cousins are millionaires as a result.

In 2004, he was the recipient of the Légion d'honneur.

In 2022, retailers founded or part-owned by Gérard Mulliez, including Auchan, Decathlon, and Leroy Merlin, face criticism for refusing to pull out from the Russian market as a result of the Russian Invasion of Ukraine and even supporting the invasion through its Russian subsidiary.

== Wealth ==
According to Challenge Magazine, he was worth 19 billion Euros in 2013, 20 billion Euros in 2014, and according to Capital, nearly 40 billion Euros in 2016 making him the first richest person in France. According to Capital, the Mulliez family was the richest family in France in 2014. According to Hurun Report, he is 18th richest person in the world with a net worth of US$30 billion. Some of his family members reside in Néchin, Belgium.

He has revealed that he has also spent less than he earns, and reinvests most of his earnings. He added that most of his wealth is tied up in family shares, and he would not be able to spend much of it. He is in favour of taxing annual incomes upwards of 500,000 Euros, but not dividends on investments, arguing that this would scare investors away.

On 21 February 2015, he paid a personal visit to the youth wing of the French Communist Party in Lille to protest about a poster accusing him of profiting from the financial crisis, as he got richer while his employees saw their spending power diminish. He argued that he employed a lot of people, adding that by the time he was their age, he had already opened his first store.

== Personal life ==
Mulliez and his wife have three children. They reside in Croix near Lille and own another house in the South of France. They are practising Roman Catholics. He enjoys spending his weekends biking and hiking in the countryside.

== Bibliography ==
- La Dynamique du client, Richard C. Whiteley and Gérard Mulliez, interview with Jean-Pierre Thiollet, Maxima, 1994 and 1997.

== See also ==
- List of French people by net worth
