= Association Familiale Mulliez =

French holding company

Association familiale Mulliez
- Type: Pacte d'actionnaires
- Industry: Grande distribution
- Founded: 1955
- Founder: Famille Mulliez
- Headquarters: Roubaix (Nord), France
- Owner: Famille Mulliez
- Subsidiaries: Auchan; Boulanger; Agapes Restauration (Flunch, Les 3 Brasseurs); Adeo (Leroy Merlin, Bricoman, Weldom, Zodio); Groupe Decathlon; Happychic (Brice, Bizzbee et Jules); Kiabi, Pimkie, Phildar; Electro Dépôt, Saint-Maclou; Midas (entreprise), Norauto; PicWicToys; RougeGorge Lingerie; Top Office, Tape à l'œil

The Association Familiale Mulliez (AFM) is the holding company of the Mulliez family. The entrepreneur family originates from around the Lille area of France, and is one of the wealthiest families in the country. AFM was founded in 1955 by Gérard Mulliez and is led by Barthélemy Guislain since 2014.

The family clan's motto is "Tous dans tout" – literally: "all (family members) in all (businesses)".

== Controlled companies ==
Via the AFM the family exerts control over the following companies most of which were founded by them:

- Adeo (85%): Hardware stores, DIY shops including Leroy Merlin (84%):(home improvement and gardening)
- Agapes: System catering
- Alinéa (37%): Furniture stores
- Aquarelle: Women's fashion
- Auchan (84%): Hypermarket-chain
- Boulanger (85%): Electronics stores
- Brice (100%): Clothing for men
- Cannelle: Lingerie
- Cultura: Books, CDs/DVDs, cultural products. It actually belongs to the Sodival holding, which is owned by Mulliez son-in-law Philippe Van der Wees
- Decathlon (85%): Sporting goods retailer, sports stores
- In Extenso: Shoes and clothing
- Jules (previously: Camaïeu homme) (54%):
- Kiabi: Clothing
- Kiloutou (sold):
- La Vignery: Wine store
- Le Plein : Charging operator
- MacoPharma: Pharmaceutical company
- Orsay: Fashion
- Phildar (sold): Fabric stores, textiles
- Picwic (sold): toy stores
- Pimkie: Young women's and girl's clothing (sold in 2023 to Lee Cooper France (70%), Kindy (15%), and Ibisler Tekstil(15%))
- Norauto, Midas Europe (10%): Car repairs
- Odyssey: International network of French schools
- Oney (previously: Banque Accord): Financial services, loans
- Saint Maclou (95%):
- Tape à l'Œil: Fashion
- Top Office: Office equipment (sold)
- Youg's: Electronics stores (sold)
- Ceetrus: Retail commercial real estate
- Nodi: Real estate (merged within Nhood)
- Nhood: Retail services management
- Voltalia

== See also ==
- Gérard Mulliez
- List of French people by net worth
- Hugues Mulliez (Group chairman at Telecel Group)
