= Leroy Merlin =

French home and gardening retailer

- Type: Subsidiary
- Industry: Retail
- Founded: 1923; 103 years ago
- Founder: Adolphe Leroy & Rose Merlin
- Headquarters: Lille, France
- Area served: France, Cyprus, Greece, Italy, Poland, Portugal, Romania, Spain, Ukraine, China, Brazil, South Africa
- Products: Do it yourself Home improvement Garden Supplies
- Revenue: 8,500,000,000 (2024)
- Owner: Groupe Mulliez (84 %); Employees (16 %)
- Number of employees: 164,764 (2021)
- Parent: Groupe Adeo
- Website: Leroy Merlin

Leroy Merlin (French: [ləʁwa mɛʁlɛ̃]) is a French-headquartered home improvement and gardening retailer serving several countries in Europe, Asia, South America, and Africa. Leroy Merlin is owned by the Mulliez family, which also owns Auchan.

== History ==
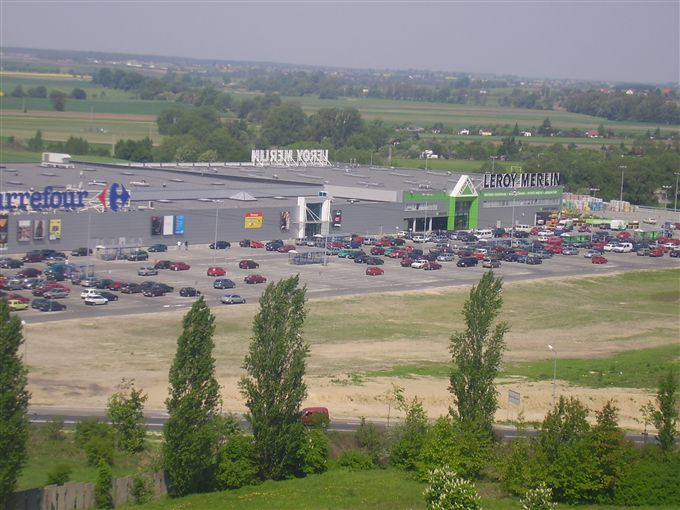
Leroy Merlin in Kalisz, Poland

Leroy Merlin around the world.

In 1923, Adolphe Leroy and Rose Merlin, associates in private and business life, opened a business of American surplus. Strengthened by this first success, they decided to sell DIY products and supplies at moderate prices. In 1960, the firm was named Leroy Merlin. It became a precursor, as it was the first company to offer free delivery services.

Generally established on the outskirts of major towns and cities, Leroy Merlin stores are large centres (9000 m^{2} on average) providing self-service and sales assisted services. Its business is centred on six main sectors: DIY, building, gardening, sanitary equipment, renewable energy, and interior decoration.

In 2022, pursuing its solar strategy, Leroy Merlin identified 36 French stores with roofs suitable for photovoltaic panels, and sought to secure its supplies of electricity from solar farms.

== Controversies ==
Following the 2022 Russian invasion of Ukraine, many Western companies pulled out of Russia. Leroy Merlin initially announced that it has no plans to reduce its operations in Russia, where it operates 143 stores. On the night of 20–21 March 2022, a shopping centre in Kyiv housing a Leroy Merlin shop was bombed. Shop employees called on the company to leave Russia, In a statement to AFP, Adeo, Leroy Merlin's holding company, said a closure would be considered a "premeditated bankruptcy" and that it has an "employer's responsibility towards [its] 45,000 employees and their families who have been contributing to the building of Leroy Merlin Russia for the past 18 years".

In March 2023, Adeo announced its intention to transfer the Russian Leroy Merlin network to local management. According to the company, this process has already begun. Earlier in July, it was named "an international sponsor of war" by the Ukrainian government after Russia obliged all large companies operating in the country "to contribute directly to its war effort". It was placed by Ukraine on the list alongside Unilever and Procter & Gamble.

== See also ==
- Home automation
- Organic garden
- Wood pellet
