= List of college softball career coaching wins leaders =

This is a list of college softball career coaching wins leaders. It is limited to coaches with at least 1,000 career wins as a head coach. This list includes games won at the NCAA levels. It does not include games won at the junior college level. Coaches with 1,000 wins at the NCAA Division I level are designated with peach shading.

== All-time leaders ==
As of the end of the 2026 NCAA softball season, Carol Hutchins of Michigan is the all-time NCAA wins leader with 1,709 wins.

Patty Gasso of Oklahoma has the highest winning percentage of all active or inactive Division I coaches with at least 1,000 wins, currently with a .813 percentage through the 2026 season.

== College softball coaches with 1,000 wins ==
=== Key ===
*	Active coach in 2026
†	Inducted into the National Fastpitch Coaches Association Hall of Fame
	1,000 wins with an NCAA Division I program (or historic equivalent) (Note: The list includes coaches with 1,000 wins regardless of division. Coaches with 1,000 wins at an NCAA Division I school (or historic equivalents) are designated with the referenced peach shading. The referenced shading has also been used for coaches with historic programs that were among the elite programs of their era.)

=== Coaches ===
Unless otherwise noted, statistics are correct through the end of the 2026 NCAA softball season."NCAA Statistics". NCAA.

Rank	Name	Years	Wins	Losses	Ties	Pct	Teams
1	Carol Hutchins †	39	1,709	552	5	.756	Ferris State (1982), Michigan (1985–2022)
2	Mike Candrea †	34	1,676	439	2	.792	Arizona (1986-2003, 2005-2007, 2009–2021)
3*	Patty Gasso †	32	1,619	371	4	.813	Oklahoma (1995–present)
4	Margie Wright †	33	1,457	542	3	.729	Illinois State (1980–1985), Fresno State (1986–2012)
5	Lori Meyer †	41	1,453	769	3	.654	Minnesota State (1985–2025)
6	Ralph Weekly †	34	1,450	481	2	.751	Pacific Lutheran (1986–1994), Chattanooga (1995–1998, 2001), Tennessee (2002–2021)
7*	Jo Evans †	41	1,413	814	2	.634	Colorado State (1986–1989), Utah (1990–1996), Texas A&M (1997–2022), UC Santa Barbara (2023–present)
8*	Karen Weekly †	30	1,404	466	2	.751	Chattanooga (1997–2001), Tennessee (2002–present)
9*	Patrick Murphy †	29	1,401	426	1	.767	Northwest Missouri State (1995); Alabama (1999–present)
10	Donna Papa †	40	1,372	820	5	.626	Susquehanna (1984–1985), North Carolina (1986–2023)
11	Diane Ninemire †	33	1,359	687	1	.664	California (1988–2020)
12	Gary Bryce †	40	1,343	796	8	.627	Wayne State (MI) (1982–2021)
13	Eugene Lenti †	37	1,329	670	6	.664	DePaul (1980–1987, 1990–2018)
14*	George Wares †	42	1,322	478	3	.734	Central (IA) (1985–present)
15	Les Stuedeman †	30	1,306	458	1	.740	Alabama-Huntsville (1996–2025)
16	Yvette Girouard †	31	1,285	421	1	.753	Louisiana–Lafayette (1981–2000), LSU (2001–2011)
17	Margo F. Jonker †	40	1,270	814	7	.609	Central Michigan (1980–2019)
18	Chris Bellotto †	36	1,252	564	1	.689	Florida Southern (1985–2020)
19	Gayle Blevins †	31	1,245	588	5	.679	Indiana (1980–1987), Iowa (1988–2010)
20*	Steve Warner	34	1,238	546	2	.694	West Virginia Wesleyan (1993–present)
21*	Rhonda Revelle †	35	1,230	704	0	.636	Nebraska Wesleyan (1987), Nebraska (1993-present)
22	Jan Hutchinson †	33	1,215	288	2	.808	Bloomsburg (1978–2010)
23*	Ken Eriksen	29	1,214	618	2	.662	South Florida (1997–present)
24*	Judy Lawes †	39	1,212	690	2	.637	Kutztown (1988–present)
25	Bob Coolen	39	1,208	831	2	.592	Bentley (1985–1989), Hawaii (1992–2025)
26*	Tim Walton †	24	1,205	331	0	.785	Wichita State (2003-2005), Florida (2006–present)
27	JoAnne Graf †	25	1,186	425	6	.735	Florida State (1984–2008)
28	Elaine Sortino †	34	1,185	508	6	.699	UMass (1980–2013)
29*	Chris Hawkins	32	1,180	493	1	.705	USC Upstate (1995-present)
30	Vickee Kazee-Hollifield †	33	1,177	427	1	.734	Carson–Newman (1986–2018)
31	Lu Harris-Champer †	25	1,174	434	1	.730	Nicholls State (1996–1997); Southern Miss (1999–2000); Georgia (2001–2021)
32*	John Tschida †	32	1,167	258	1	.819	Saint Mary's University of Minnesota (1995–2000), St. Thomas (MN) (2001–2021), Saint Mary's University of Minnesota (2022–present)
33	Melinda Fischer †	39	1,170	869	4	.574	Eastern Illinois (1979–1980), Illinois State (1986–2022)
34	Bob Brock †	34	1,148	779	2	.596	Baylor (1980–1981), Texas A&M (1982–1996), Sam Houston (2002–2018)
35	Frank Cheek †	25	1,147	363	2	.759	Humboldt State (1989–2013)
36	Kathy Welter	32	1,126	573	7	.662	Oklahoma Baptist (1980–1982), Texas Tech (1983–1985), Cal State Bakersfield (1986–2011)
37*	Glenn Moore	30	1,111	563	0	.664	William Carey (1996), LSU (1998–2000), Baylor (2001–present)
38*	Shena Hollar	29	1,104	443	2	.713	Newberry (1998-1999), Lenoir-Rhyne (2000-present)
39	Mike Davenport	24	1,096	282	0	.795	North Georgia (2001–2024)
40*	Kim Wilson	36	1,075	375	2	.741	Washington & Jefferson (1991–1996), Rowan (1997–present)
41	Donna Fields †	27	1,071	503	0	.680	St. Mary's University (TX) (1998–2024)
42*	Travis Scott	26	1,067	392	3	.731	Southeastern Oklahoma State (2001–2003), Angelo State (2004–present)
43	Joyce Compton †	28	1,066	563	3	.654	Missouri 1983–1986, South Carolina (1987–2010)
44*	Michelle Frew	30	1,065	445	1	.705	Rollins (1996–1998, 2000–2021), Charleston (2023–2024), Eckerd (2025–present)
45*	Megan Bryant	39	1,061	901	9	.541	Stetson (1986–1987), Drake (1989–1999), Stony Brook (2001–present)
46*	Denny Griffin	38	1,057	446	0	.703	Alma (1989–present)
47*	Greg Jones	26	1,054	361	4	.744	Winona State (2001-present)
48	Mike Smith	25	1,054	450	1	.701	Biola (1999-2002), UC Riverside (2003), McNeese (2012-2014), Ole Miss (2015-2019), California Baptist (2004-2011, 2022-2025)
49	Sandy Montgomery †	30	1,050	541	2	.660	SIU Edwardsville (1989–2018)
50	Rick Bertagnolli †	33	1,045	403	0	.722	USC Upstate (1992–1993), PennWest California (1994–2024)
51	Jay Miller †	32	1,043	726	0	.590	Purdue (1980–1981), Oklahoma City (1985–1987), Missouri (1988–2002), Mississippi State (2003–2011), Hofstra (2019–2021)
52	Jana McGinnis	31	1,038	608	0	.631	Jacksonville State (1994–2024)
53	George DiMatteo	31	1,032	539	6	.656	Lewis (1984–2014)
54*	John Rittman	25	1,021	451	3	.693	Stanford (1997–2014), Clemson (2020–present)
55*	Lonni Alameda	23	1,020	394	3	.721	UNLV (2004–2008), Florida State (2009–present)
56	Linda Kalafatis	32	1,016	670	3	.602	California (PA) (1989–1993), Akron (1994–1996), Ohio State 1997–2012), Charleston (2014–2021)
57	Sandy Jerstad †	27	1,011	359	2	.738	Augustana (SD) (1977–2003)
58	Tami Cyr	26	1,006	504	2	.666	Centenary (LA) (1987–1991), West Florida (1992–2014)
59	Joan Joyce †	28	1,005	667	1	.601	Florida Atlantic (1995–2022)

== See also ==
- National Fastpitch Coaches Association Hall of Fame
- NCAA Division I Softball Championship
