= Hawaii Rainbow Warriors and Rainbow Wahine =

Athletic teams of University of Hawaiʻi at Manoa

Hawaii Rainbow Warriors and Rainbow Wāhine
- University: University of Hawaiʻi at Mānoa
- Nickname: Rainbow Warriors (men's), Rainbow Wāhine (women's)
- NCAA: Division I (FBS)
- Conference: Mountain West (primary); Big West (women's beach volleyball, men's volleyball, women's water polo); PCCSC (sailing)
- Athletic director: Matt Elliott
- Location: Honolulu, Hawaii
- Varsity teams: 19
- Football stadium: Clarence T. C. Ching Athletics Complex (temporary)
- Basketball arena: Bankoh Arena at the Stan Sheriff Center
- Baseball stadium: Les Murakami Stadium
- Softball stadium: Rainbow Wahine Softball Stadium
- Soccer stadium: Waipiʻo Peninsula Soccer Stadium
- Aquatics center: Duke Kahanamoku Aquatic Complex
- Other venues: Clarence T. C. Ching Athletics Complex; UH Tennis Complex
- Colors: Green, black, silver, and white
- Website: hawaiiathletics.com/index.aspx

The Hawaii Rainbow Warriors and Rainbow Wāhine are the athletic teams that represent the University of Hawaiʻi at Mānoa (UH), in Honolulu, Hawaii. The UH athletics program is a member of the Mountain West Conference in most sports and competes at the NCAA Division I level. It comprises seven men's, 12 women's, and two coed athletic teams.

== Nickname ==
Hawaiʻi athletics began more than a century ago, with the first football team being fielded in 1909. Through 1923, the UH teams were called the "Deans." In the final game of the 1923 season, the football team upset Oregon State, with a rainbow appearing over the stadium during the game. Sportswriters began referring to UH teams as the "Rainbows," and the tradition was born that Hawaii could not lose if a rainbow appeared. The rainbow officially became a part of the school's athletic logo in 1982 and remained until 2000.

King Kamehameha the Great and his warriors united the Hawaiian Islands, earning the warrior a place of honor in Hawaiian history and an expectation of strength, skill and a fighting spirit. The UH teams became known as "Rainbow Warriors" long before the name became official in 1974.

When women's teams were begun in 1972, founder and first women's athletic director Dr. Donnis Thompson named the teams the "Rainbow Wāhine" with "wāhine" being Hawaiian for women.

Both the men's and the women's teams have long been known as the "Rainbows" or merely the "'Bows."

A controversial change in 2000 allowed each team to pick its own team name; the football, men's volleyball, golf, and tennis teams became the Warriors, while the men's basketball and swimming & diving teams remained Rainbow Warriors, and the baseball team became the Rainbows. The women's teams, however, all remained the “Rainbow Wāhine." At the same time, the school changed its athletics logo to the current stylized "H," omitting the rainbow of the old logo altogether.

On July 1, 2013, the nicknames of the university's men's sports teams were once again standardized, and all male teams at the university are now referred to as the "Rainbow Warriors." More recently, the women's beach volleyball team, while still officially "Rainbow Wāhine," generally uses "SandBows" (now colloquially known as BeachBows).

== History ==
=== Conference affiliation ===
The Hawaiʻi men's teams competed as independents until joining the Western Athletic Conference (WAC) in 1979. The women's teams were independents until joining the Pacific Coast Athletic Association in 1985, with that conference rebranding as the Big West Conference (BWC) in 1988. In 1996, the women's teams joined the men in the WAC.

In July 2012, most of the school's teams moved from the WAC to the women's former league, the Big West Conference. Since the Big West did not sponsor football, the Rainbow Warriors became affiliate members of the Mountain West Conference (MW).

Teams in sports not sponsored by the Big West compete as members of the Mountain Pacific Sports Federation.

In October 2024, Hawai’i announced that it would join the MW as a full member on July 1, 2026. At the time of announcement, four sports that UH housed in the Big West were not sponsored by the MW—men's swimming & diving and volleyball, plus women's beach volleyball and water polo. UH reached an agreement with the BWC to continue to house those four sports in that conference after otherwise joining the MW. However, the MW announced in October 2025 that it would begin sponsoring men's swimming & diving in 2026–27 with Hawai’i as an inaugural member.

== Sports sponsored ==
Men's sports	Women's sports
Baseball	Basketball
Basketball	Beach volleyball
Football	Cross country
Golf	Golf
Swimming and diving	Soccer
Tennis	Softball
Volleyball	Swimming and diving
	Tennis
	Track and field^{1}
	Volleyball
	Water polo
Co-ed sport
Sailing
^{1} – includes both indoor and outdoor

=== Football ===
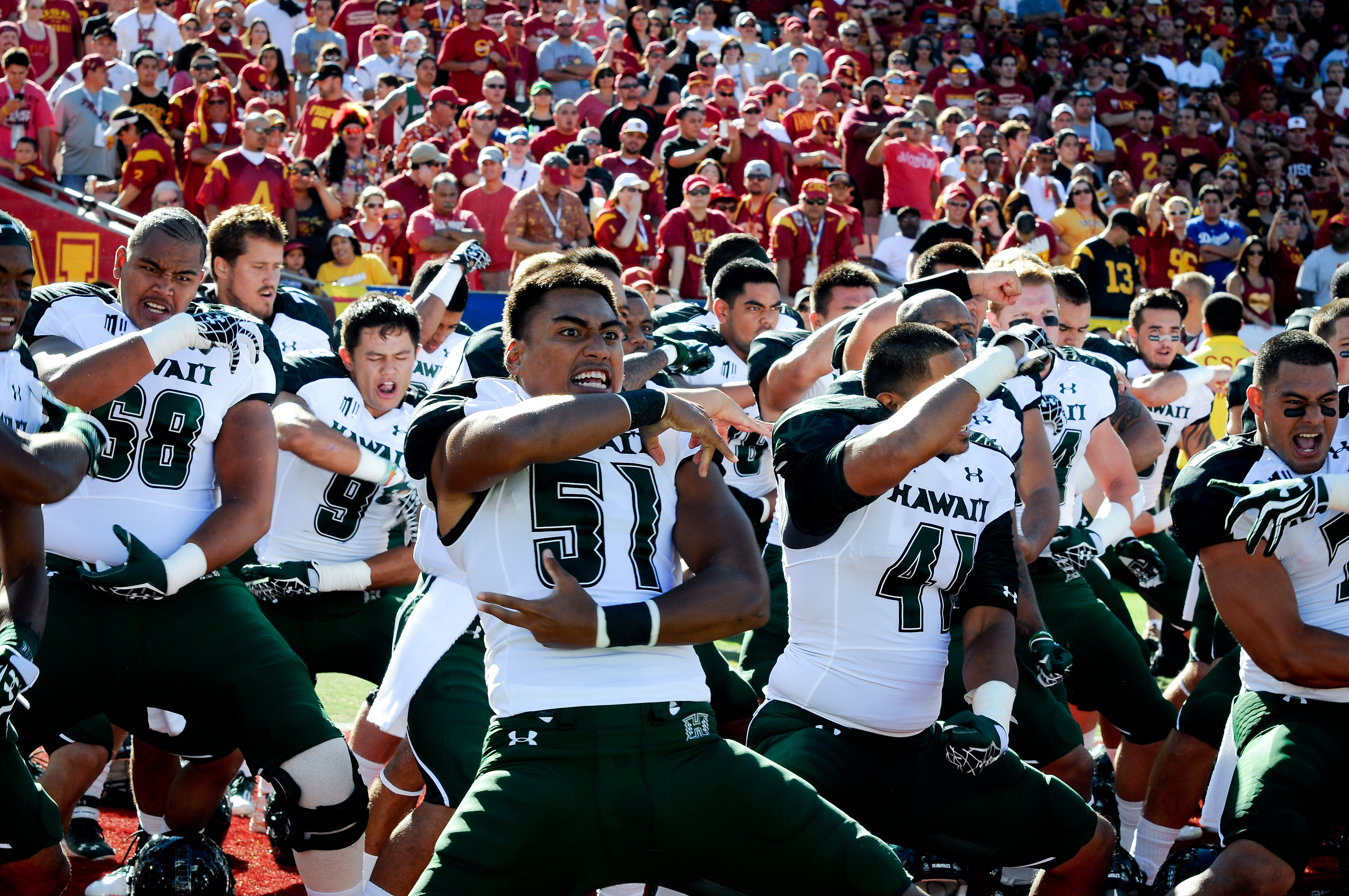
Hawaii players during a game in 2012

The Hawaiʻi Rainbow Warriors football team competes in NCAA Division I FBS college football. The team, which is currently coached by Timmy Chang, joined the Mountain West Conference in July 2012. The Warriors have a bowl record of 8-6, and four conference titles.

Under former coach June Jones, they were the third BCS non-AQ team to play in a BCS bowl game, having faced Georgia in the Sugar Bowl on January 1, 2008, losing to Georgia 41-10. Hawaiʻi was ranked 10th and UGA ranked 5th in the nation. Hawaiʻi was the only undefeated team of the 2007 season, before losing in the Sugar Bowl on January 1, 2008. In 2010 the Warriors won their third WAC title under coach Greg McMackin.

In 2019, the Warriors under Nick Rolovich finished 10-5, and played Boise State in the program's first-ever Mountain West Championship in Boise, Idaho.

=== Men's volleyball ===
The Hawaiʻi Rainbow Warriors volleyball team represents the University of Hawaiʻi at Mānoa in NCAA Division I college volleyball and play their home games at the Stan Sheriff Center. They are currently coached by Charlie Wade. The team's first title came in 2002 defeating Pepperdine 3–1, however this title later vacated by the NCAA for reasons unknown. The team later won back-to-back NCAA men's volleyball championships in 2021 and 2022

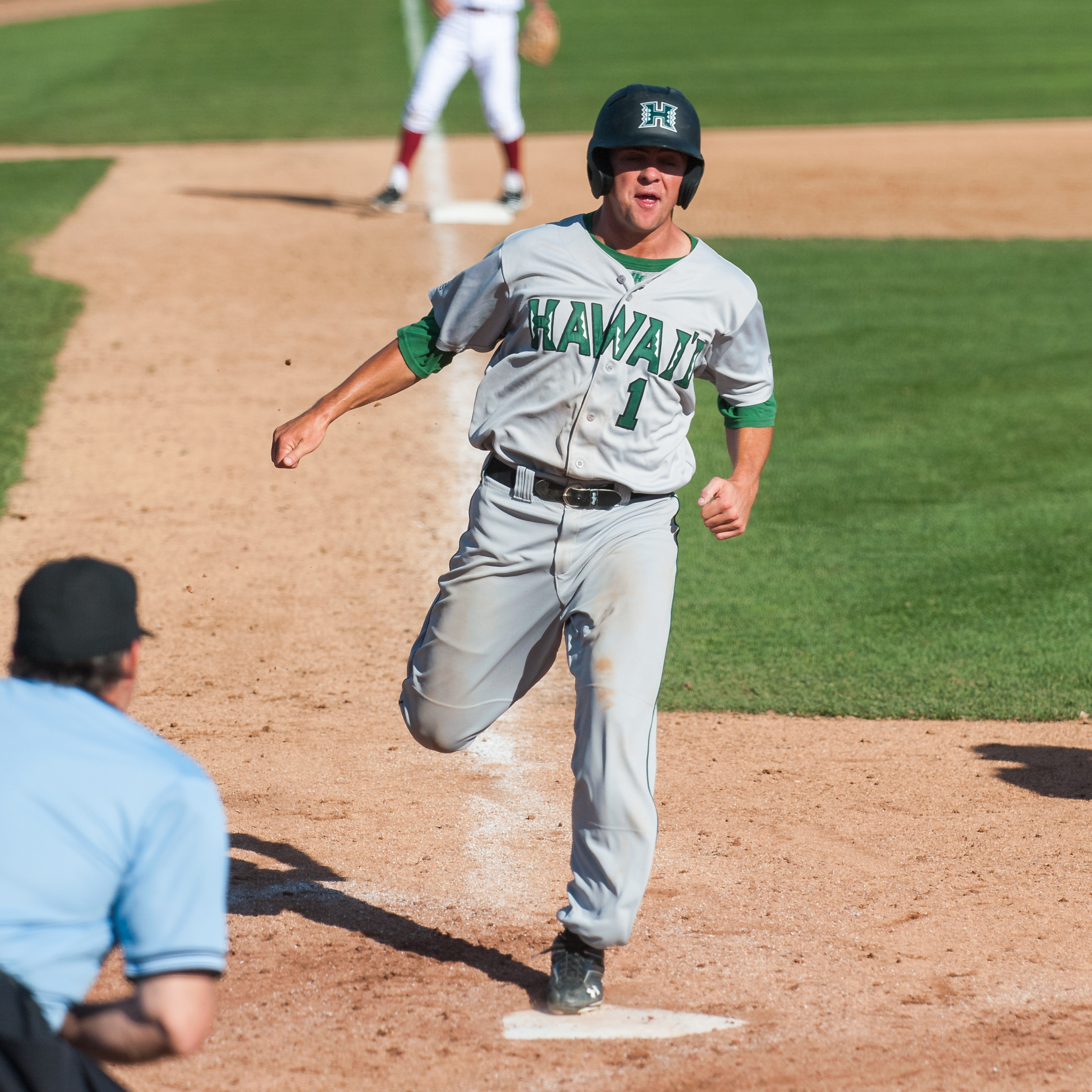
A Hawaii baseball player scoring a run during a game in 2011

=== Baseball ===
The Rainbow Warriors have made one appearance in the College World Series, finishing as the runner up to champion Arizona in the 1980 College World Series. Since 2022, the team is led by head coach Rich Hill.

=== Men's basketball ===
The Rainbow Warriors are coached by Eran Ganot. In 2015, the university self-imposed penalties as a result of NCAA violations committed by the previous coaching staff that included vacating 36 wins from the 2012–13 and 2013–14 seasons, reducing scholarships and practice time, and placing itself on one-year probation. The university also agreed to pay a $10,000 fine. The team's most recent appearance in the NCAA Division I men's basketball tournament was in 2026.

=== Women's basketball ===
The Hawaiʻi Rainbow Wāhine basketball team represents the University of Hawaiʻi at Mānoa. They are currently coached by Laura Beeman. The team plays its home games at the Stan Sheriff Center.

=== Women's volleyball ===
The Hawaiʻi Rainbow Wāhine volleyball team represents the University of Hawaiʻi at Mānoa in NCAA Division I college volleyball and play their home games at the Stan Sheriff Center. They are currently coached by Joshua Walker. The team is one of the most successful women's volleyball programs in the country having won 4 national championships (3 NCAA, 1 AIAW). The Rainbow Wāhine volleyball team has made the NCAA tournament every year since 1993.

=== Women's beach volleyball ===
The Hawaiʻi Rainbow Wāhine beach volleyball team, also known as the Hawaiʻi "Beach Bows", is the NCAA Division I beach volleyball team at the University of Hawaiʻi at Mānoa.

=== Softball ===
The Hawaiʻi Rainbow Wāhine softball team is the NCAA Division I college softball team for the University of Hawaiʻi at Mānoa. They are currently coached by Bob Coolen. The team has made one appearance in the Women's College World Series in 2010.

== National Championships ==
=== NCAA team championships ===
Hawai'i has won 6 NCAA team national championships.

- Men's (3):
- Volleyball: 2002^{1}, 2021, 2022, 2026
- Women's (3):
- Volleyball: 1982, 1983, 1987

^{1} Vacated by NCAA

=== Non NCAA team championships ===
- Women's (2):
- Volleyball: 1979
- Women's Sailing: 2001

== Traditions ==
=== School colors ===
The school colors for the Hawaiʻi Rainbow Warriors and Rainbow Wāhine are green, white, black and silver. The white and green colors were chosen by the wives of the faculty. In 2000, a new athletics logo was created that included black and silver, so those colors are now also used by the athletics department.

== In film ==
The creation of the first Rainbow Wāhine teams at the University of Hawaiʻi is the subject of the documentary film Rise of the Wahine, directed by Dean Kaneshiro. Rise of the Wāhine features the struggles of these first women's teams after the passing of Title IX and the film highlights the roles of coaches Alan Kang and Dave Shoji, first female Athletic Director Dr. Donnis Thompson, Patsy Mink, and first-teams volleyball players Beth McLachlin, Marilyn Moniz-Kaho`ohanonaho, Joyce Kapua`ala, and Joey Akeo.
