= Margo Jonker =

American softball coach

Margo F. Jonker
Biographical details
- Born: 1953 or 1954 (age 72–73)

Coaching career (HC unless noted)

College Softball
- 1977–1979: Grand Valley State (asst.)
- 1978–1979: West Ottawa High School
- 1980–2019: Central Michigan

Volleyball
- 1976: Hope College
- 1977–1978: Hope College (asst.)
- 1979: Central Michigan (asst.)

National Softball
- 1998–2000: USA Women's Softball (asst.)

Head coaching record
- Overall: Softball: 1246–780–6 (.615); Volleyball: 12–15 (.444)

Accomplishments and honors

Championships
- 10× MAC Regular Season Champions (1982, 1986, 1987, 1991, 1994, 1996, 1997, 2001, 2002, 2004, 2017) 11× MAC Tournament Champions (1982, 1983, 1984, 1986, 1997, 1999, 2000, 2001, 2002, 2013); MAC East Division Champions (1984) 7× MAC West Division Champions (1998, 2001, 2002, 2004, 2005, 2008, 2017)

Awards
- NFCA Hall of Fame (2003) 10× MAC Coach of the Year (1983, 1984, 1986, 1987, 1991, 1994, 1996, 1997, 2002, 2017); NFCA Coach of the Year (1987); NCAA Mideast Region Coach of the Year (1987); 2× NFCA Great Lakes Regional Coach of the Year (1994, 2000); Grand Valley State Hall of Fame (1989); Michigan Amateur Softball Hall of Fame (2000); West Ottawa High School Hall of Fame (2001) Metro Detroit Amateur Softball Association (2014)
Medal record
Assistant coach for Women's Softball
Representing the United States
Olympic Games
Gold medal – first place	2000 Sydney	Team
Assistant coach for ISF Women's World Championship
Gold medal – first place	1998 Fujinomiya
Assistant coach for Softball at the Pan American Games
Gold medal – first place	1999 Winnipeg

Margo F. Jonker is an American softball coach and the current head coach of the Central Michigan Chippewas. She was a 2003 inductee in the National Fastpitch Coaches Association Hall of Fame.

== Career ==
During her 31 years as head coach, the Chippewas have gone to the NCAA tournament 13 times and have 11 Mid-American Conference (MAC) titles. Jonker was formerly an assistant softball coach at Grand Valley State University and head coach at West Ottawa High School. CMU's Margo Jonker stadium is named after her.

At the 2000 Olympics she served as an assistant coach on the United States Olympic softball team that captured the gold medal in Sydney, Australia.

She is a Holland, Michigan native and attended and played softball for the Grand Valley State Lakers.

== Head coaching record ==
=== Volleyball ===
Record table
Season	Team	Overall	Conference	Standing	Postseason
Hope College (Michigan Intercollegiate Athletic Association) (1976–1976)
1976	Hope	12–15		4th	
Hope:		12–15 (.444)			
Total:		12–15 (.444)			
National champion Postseason invitational champion Conference regular season champion Conference regular season and conference tournament champion Division regular season champion Division regular season and conference tournament champion Conference tournament champion

=== Softball ===
Record table
Season	Team	Overall	Conference	Standing	Postseason
Central Michigan () (1980–1981)
1980	Central Michigan	16–12			
1981	Central Michigan	30–13–1			
Central Michigan (Mid-American Conference) (1982–2019)
1982	Central Michigan	51–12		1st	AIAW Women's College World Series
1983	Central Michigan	36–17–2	6–2–1	2nd (West)	NCAA Regional
1984	Central Michigan	34–11–1	8–2	1st (East)	
1985	Central Michigan	44–12	12–4	2nd	NCAA Regional
1986	Central Michigan	45–20	16–2	1st	NCAA Regional
1987	Central Michigan	37–14	11–1	1st	Women's College World Series
1988	Central Michigan	38–23	18–14	5th	
1989	Central Michigan	29–27	15–17	5th	
1990	Central Michigan	32–22	14–9	3rd	
1991	Central Michigan	39–22	21–7	1st	NCAA Regional
1992	Central Michigan	29–20	14–13	4th	
1993	Central Michigan	26–26	17–13	5th	
1994	Central Michigan	32–24	23–11	1st	NCAA Regional
1995	Central Michigan	26–21	21–12	2nd	
1996	Central Michigan	40–21	26–6	1st	NCAA Regional
1997	Central Michigan	41–22	22–6	1st	NCAA Regional
1998	Central Michigan	31–23–1	22–5	1st (West)	
1999	Central Michigan	41–18	20–8	2nd (West)	NCAA Regional
2000	Central Michigan	33–13	15–5	2nd (West)	NCAA Regional
2001	Central Michigan	37–20	20–4	1st (West)	NCAA Regional
2002	Central Michigan	39–16	23–1	1st (West)	NCAA Regional
2003	Central Michigan	26–18	14–7	2nd (West)	
2004	Central Michigan	32–19	21–3	1st (West)	NCAA Regional
2005	Central Michigan	29–16	16–6	1st (West)	
2006	Central Michigan	22–27	13–7	2nd (West)	
2007	Central Michigan	27–20	11–7	2nd (West)	
2008	Central Michigan	25–20	14–7	1st (West)	
2009	Central Michigan	12–31	4–17	6th (West)	
2010	Central Michigan	27–19	12–8	2nd (West)	
2011	Central Michigan	32–21	13–9	5th (West)	
2012	Central Michigan	30–27	11–10	3rd (West)	
2013	Central Michigan	33–20	15–7	2nd (West)	NCAA Regional
2014	Central Michigan	34–22	10–10	2nd (West)	
2015	Central Michigan	27–23	12–8	2nd (West)	
2016	Central Michigan	24–27–1	11–11–1	4th (West)	
2017	Central Michigan	37–15	18–5	1st (West)	
2018	Central Michigan	22–26	12–11	4th (West)	
2019	Central Michigan	18–22–1	8–5–1		
Central Michigan:		1246–780–6 (.615)	551–275–2 (.667)		
Total:		1246–780–6 (.615)			
National champion Postseason invitational champion Conference regular season champion Conference regular season and conference tournament champion Division regular season champion Division regular season and conference tournament champion Conference tournament champion

== See also ==
- List of college softball coaches with 1,000 wins
