= Matthew Elliott =

Matthew or Matt Elliott may refer to:

- Matthew Elliott, Baron Elliott of Mickle Fell (born 1978), British political strategist and lobbyist
- Matthew Elliott (cricketer) (born 1971), Australian Test cricketer
- Matthew Elliott (loyalist) (1739–1814), British agent in the American Revolution and War of 1812
- Matthew Elliott (rugby league) (born 1964), Australian rugby league footballer and coach
- Matt Elliott (American football) (born 1968), American football player
- Matt Elliott (footballer) (born 1968), retired Scottish international footballer
- Matt Elliott (musician), founder of The Third Eye Foundation
- Matt Elliott (sports executive) (born 1976/7), American college athletic director
- Matt Elliott (writer) (born 1969), New Zealand author
