= 1991 Arizona Wildcats softball team =

American college softball season

1991 Arizona Wildcats softball

National Champion NCAA Regional champion
- Conference: Pacific-10 Conference
- Record: 50–15 (11–9 Pac-10)
- Head coach: Mike Candrea (6th season)

1991 Pacific-10 Conference softball standings
	Conf.				Overall
Team	W		L	PCT	W		L	PCT
UCLA ‍†‍‍^{y}	16	–	4	.800	50	–	5	.909
Arizona State ‍‍‍^{y}	15	–	5	.750	43	–	16	.729
California ‍‍‍^{y}	14	–	6	.700	48	–	18	.727
Arizona ‍‍‍^{y}	11	–	9	.550	56	–	16	.778
Oregon ‍‍‍	4	–	16	.200	29	–	29	.500
Oregon State ‍‍‍	0	–	20	.000	9	–	43	.173
† – Conference champion y – Invited to the NCAA tournament

The 1991 Arizona Wildcats softball team represented the University of Arizona in the 1991 NCAA Division I softball season. The Wildcats were coached by Mike Candrea, who led his sixth season. The Wildcats finished with a record of 56–16. They competed in the Pacific-10 Conference, where they finished fourth with a 11–9 record.

The Wildcats were invited to the 1991 NCAA Division I softball tournament, where they swept the West Regional and then completed a run through the Women's College World Series to claim their first NCAA Women's College World Series Championship and first women's team championship in school history. This title would start a run of eight WCWS championships over seventeen seasons and lead to recognition as one of the top programs in the nation.

== Roster ==
1991 Arizona Wildcats roster
Pitchers: 1 – Susie Parra – freshman; 32 – Debby Day – junior; Catchers: 10 – Renee Rosas – sophomore; 15 – Jody Miller – sophomore	Infielders: 3 – Stephanie Salcidio – junior; 4 – Julie Standering – senior; 5 – Susie Duarte – freshman; 7 – Julie Jones – senior; 8 – Marcie Aguilar – senior; 11 – Lisa Guise – sophomore	Outfielders: 2 – Kristin Gauthier – senior; 16 – Teresa Castillo – freshman; 22 – Suzie Lady – senior; 23 – Stacy Redondo – sophomore; 24 – Jamie Heggen – sophomore

== Schedule ==
Legend
	Arizona win
	Arizona loss
*	Non-Conference game

1991 Arizona Wildcats softball game log
Regular season

February
Date	Opponent	Site/stadium	Score	Overall record	Pac-10 record
Feb 8	Utah State*	Tucson, AZ	W 1–0	1–0	
Feb 8	Utah State*	Tucson, AZ	L 0–2	1–1	
Feb 9	UIC*	Tucson, AZ	W 7–0	2–1	
Feb 9	UIC*	Tucson, AZ	W 6–0	3–1	
Feb 14	Pacific*	Tucson, AZ	W 8–0^{5}	4–1	
Feb 14	Sacramento State*	Tucson, AZ	W 2–0	5–1	
Feb 15	UT Arlington*	Tucson, AZ	W 3–1	6–1	
Feb 15	New Mexico State*	Tucson, AZ	W 8–0^{5}	7–1	
Feb 16	California*	Tucson, AZ	W 4–0	8–1	
Feb 16	Florida State*	Tucson, AZ	W 8–0^{5}	9–1	
Feb 16	Ohio State*	Tucson, AZ	L 0–1^{8}	9–2	
Feb 22	vs Iowa*	Tempe, AZ	W 9–2	10–2	
Feb 22	vs UNLV*	Tempe, AZ	W 1–0	11–2	
Feb 23	vs Illinois State*	Tempe, AZ	W 3–2	12–2	
Feb 24	vs Cal Poly*	Tempe, AZ	W 5–0	13–2	
Feb 24	vs UC Santa Barbara*	Tempe, AZ	W 8–0^{5}	14–2	
Feb 24	vs Colorado State*	Tempe, AZ	W 4–0	15–2	

March
Date	Opponent	Site/stadium	Score	Overall record	Pac-10 record
Mar 1	vs Michigan*	Las Cruces, NM	W 11–0^{6}	16–2	
Mar 1	vs Toledo*	Las Cruces, NM	W 4–0	17–2	
Mar 1	vs Wichita State*	Las Cruces, NM	W 10–0^{5}	18–2	
Mar 2	vs Colorado State*	Las Cruces, NM	W 4–2	19–2	
Mar 2	vs Eastern Michigan*	Las Cruces, NM	W 9–2	20–2	
Mar 2	vs Fresno State*	Las Cruces, NM	W 2–1	21–2	
Mar 2	vs Oklahoma State*	Las Cruces, NM	L 0–1^{8}	21–3	
Mar 8	Western New Mexico*	Tucson, AZ	W 9–0^{5}	22–3	
Mar 8	Western New Mexico*	Tucson, AZ	W 8–0^{6}	23–3	
Mar 9	Utah*	Tucson, AZ	W 3–1	24–3	
Mar 9	Utah*	Tucson, AZ	W 8–3	25–3	
Mar 12	Texas A&M*	Tucson, AZ	L 1–2	25–4	
Mar 12	Texas A&M*	Tucson, AZ	W 5–2^{8}	26–4	
Mar 14	vs North Carolina*	Fullerton, CA	W 3–2^{8}	27–4	
Mar 14	vs Southwest Texas State*	Fullerton, CA	W 13–2^{5}	28–4	
Mar 15	vs Kansas*	Fullerton, CA	W 3–2^{12}	29–4	
Mar 21	vs Cal Poly Pomona*	Fullerton, CA	W 1–0^{8}	30–4	
Mar 22	vs Akron*	Fullerton, CA	W 1–0^{9}	31–4	
Mar 22	vs Colorado State*	Fullerton, CA	W 2–0	32–4	
Mar 22	vs Oregon State*	Fullerton, CA	W 2–0	33–4	
Mar 23	vs Oklahoma State*	Fullerton, CA	W 2–1	34–4	
Mar 24	vs UNLV*	Fullerton, CA	L 0–2	34–5	

April
Date	Opponent	Site/stadium	Score	Overall record	Pac-10 record
Apr 4	at California	Hearst Field • Berkeley, CA	L 0–1^{10}	34–6	0–1
Apr 4	at California	Hearst Field • Berkeley, CA	W 4–0	35–6	1–1
Apr 5	at Saint Mary's*	Moraga, CA	W 11–0^{5}	36–6	
Apr 5	at Saint Mary's*	Moraga, CA	W 5–0	37–6	
Apr 6	at UCLA	Sunset Field • Los Angeles, CA	L 0–3	37–7	1–2
Apr 6	at UCLA	Sunset Field • Los Angeles, CA	L 0–5	37–8	1–3
Apr 9	New Mexico State*	Tucson, AZ	W 2–0	38–8	
Apr 9	New Mexico State*	Tucson, AZ	W 7–2	39–8	
Apr 12	Oregon State	Tucson, AZ	W 9–2	40–8	2–3
Apr 12	Oregon State	Tucson, AZ	W 2–1	41–8	3–3
Apr 13	Oregon	Tucson, AZ	W 3–2	42–8	4–3
Apr 13	Oregon	Tucson, AZ	W 5–0	43–8	5–3
Apr 17	Arizona State	Tucson, AZ	W 3–2^{8}	44–8	6–3
Apr 17	Arizona State	Tucson, AZ	L 0–5	44–9	6–4
Apr 19	Cal State Northridge*	Tucson, AZ	W 5–0	45–9	
Apr 19	Cal State Northridge*	Tucson, AZ	L 0–1	45–10	
Apr 20	California	Tucson, AZ	L 1–3	45–11	6–5
Apr 20	California	Tucson, AZ	L 0–1	45–12	6–6
Apr 23	at Arizona State	Tempe, AZ	L 1–2	45–13	6–7
Apr 23	at Arizona State	Tempe, AZ	L 0–3	45–14	6–8
Apr 26	Oregon State	Tucson, AZ	W 10–0^{5}	46–14	7–8
Apr 26	Oregon State	Tucson, AZ	W 1–0	47–14	8–8
Apr 27	Oregon	Tucson, AZ	W 9–0^{5}	48–14	9–8
Apr 27	Oregon	Tucson, AZ	W 8–2	49–14	10–8

May
Date	Opponent	Site/stadium	Score	Overall record	Pac-10 record
May 5	UCLA	Tucson, AZ	L 1–2	49–15	10–9
May 5	UCLA	Tucson, AZ	W 1–0	50–15	11–9

Postseason

NCAA Regional
Date	Opponent	Site/stadium	Score	Overall record	NCAAT record
May 17	at Arizona State	Tempe, AZ	W 4–2	51–15	1–0
May 18	at Arizona State	Tempe, AZ	W 4–0	52–15	2–0

NCAA Women's College World Series
Date	Opponent	Site/stadium	Score	Overall record	WCWS Record
May 23	UNLV	ASA Hall of Fame Stadium • Oklahoma City, OK	W 1–0^{13}	53–15	1–0
May 24	UCLA	ASA Hall of Fame Stadium • Oklahoma City, OK	W 1–0^{9}	54–15	2–0
May 25	Long Beach State	ASA Hall of Fame Stadium • Oklahoma City, OK	W 1–0^{8}	55–15	3–0
May 25	Fresno State	ASA Hall of Fame Stadium • Oklahoma City, OK	L 0–1	55–16	3–1
May 26	UCLA	ASA Hall of Fame Stadium • Oklahoma City, OK	W 5–1	56–16	4–1
