= Jerstad =

Jerstad is a surname. Notable people with the surname include:

- John L. Jerstad (1918–1943), United States Army Air Forces officer
- Lute Jerstad (1936–1998), American mountaineer and mountain guide
- Sandy Jerstad (born 1943), American politician
