= Joyce Compton (softball) =

American softball coach (born 1950)

Biographical details
- Born: December 13, 1950 (age 75); Trenton, New Jersey, U.S.
- Education: Trenton State College

Coaching career (HC unless noted)
- 1983–1986: Missouri
- 1987–2010: South Carolina

Head coaching record
- Overall: 1,066–563–4 (.654)

Accomplishments and honors

Awards
- 2× SEC Coach of the Year (1997, 2002)

Joyce Compton (born December 13, 1950) is an American former college softball head coach. She served as the head coach for Missouri and South Carolina.

== Early life ==
Compton attended Allentown High School where she was a three-sport athlete, playing field hockey, basketball and softball. Following high school, she attended Trenton State College. She then played professionally for the Raybestos Brakettes and Connecticut Falcons.

== Playing career ==
With her teams, she won three Amateur Softball Association and four International Women's Professional Softball Association titles throughout the 1970s. Compton won the 1974 Women's Softball World Championship with the American team.

== Coaching career ==
Compton began her coaching career at Mattatuck Community College in 1976. She served as head coach for seven seasons and posted a 93–19 record. She then served as head coach at Missouri for four seasons and posted a 115–77 record. During her first season at Missouri in 1983, she helped the Tigers win the Big 8 championship and advance to the Women's College World Series for the first time in program history.

Compton then served as head coach at South Carolina from 1987 until 2010. In 24 years as head coach, she posted a 951–486–4 record, becoming the winningest in coach in program history, regardless of sport. In 1997, during South Carolina's first year in the Southeastern Conference (SEC), the Gamecocks finished with a record 63–5 setting a program record for wins, won the inaugural SEC regular season and SEC tournament championships and advanced to the Women's College World Series. The Gamecocks won the SEC East four times, and the SEC tournament twice. She was named the inaugural SEC Coach of the Year winner in 1997. She is one of nine coaches to win at least 950 games at a single NCAA Division I school. She led the Gamecocks to 13 NCAA regional appearances, one super regional appearance and two Women's College World Series appearances.

She was inducted into the National Fastpitch Coaches Association Hall of Fame in 2002. At the time of her retirement, she ranked tenth among all NCAA softball coaches in career wins, regardless of division, and ninth in NCAA Division I, with a record of 1,066–563–4. The Gamecocks retired her jersey in 2022.

== Head coaching record ==
Record table
Season	Team	Overall	Conference	Standing	Postseason
Missouri (Big 8 Conference) (1983–1986)
1983	Missouri	40–13			Women's College World Series
1984	Missouri	21–18			
1985	Missouri	29–23			
1986	Missouri	25–23			
Missouri:		115–77 (.599)			
South Carolina (Independent) (1987–1996)
1987	South Carolina	34–14			
1988	South Carolina	47–14			NCAA Regional
1989	South Carolina	46–12			Women's College World Series
1990	South Carolina	49–14			
1991	South Carolina	51–13			
1992	South Carolina	54–14–1			
1993	South Carolina	36–21–1			
1994	South Carolina	52–17			NCAA Regional
1995	South Carolina	53–21			NCAA Regional
1996	South Carolina	38–13			NCAA Regional
South Carolina (Southeastern Conference) (1997–2010)
1997	South Carolina	63–5	25–1	1st	Women's College World Series
1998	South Carolina	36–21	15–11	2nd (East)	
1999	South Carolina	49–21	17–11	T-1st (East)	NCAA Regional
2000	South Carolina	41–28	11–16	3rd (East)	NCAA Regional
2001	South Carolina	40–20–1	18–8	1st (East)	NCAA Regional
2002	South Carolina	46–20	20–10	1st (East)	NCAA Regional
2003	South Carolina	41–20	18–10	2nd (East)	NCAA Regional
2004	South Carolina	28–24	12–18	4th (East)	NCAA Regional
2005	South Carolina	28–28–1	11–16	4th (East)	
2006	South Carolina	28–30	8–21	4th (East)	
2007	South Carolina	38–26	12–16	4th (East)	NCAA Super Regional
2008	South Carolina	21–26	8–18	4th (East)	
2009	South Carolina	21–24	6–21	5th (East)	
2010	South Carolina	11–40	1–27	5th (East)	
South Carolina:		951–486–4 (.661)	182–204 (.472)		
Total:		1,066–563–4 (.654)			
National champion Postseason invitational champion Conference regular season champion Conference regular season and conference tournament champion Division regular season champion Division regular season and conference tournament champion Conference tournament champion
