= 1991 UCLA Bruins softball team =

American college softball season

1991 UCLA Bruins softball

Pac-10 champion NCAA Northwest Regional champion

Women's College World Series, runner-up
- Conference: Pacific-10 Conference
- Record: 56–7 (16–4 Pac-10)
- Head coach: Sharron Backus (17th season) & Sue Enquist (3rd season)
- Home stadium: Sunset Field

1991 Pacific-10 Conference softball standings
	Conf.				Overall
Team	W		L	PCT	W		L	PCT
UCLA ‍†‍‍^{y}	16	–	4	.800	50	–	5	.909
Arizona State ‍‍‍^{y}	15	–	5	.750	43	–	16	.729
California ‍‍‍^{y}	14	–	6	.700	48	–	18	.727
Arizona ‍‍‍^{y}	11	–	9	.550	56	–	16	.778
Oregon ‍‍‍	4	–	16	.200	29	–	29	.500
Oregon State ‍‍‍	0	–	20	.000	9	–	43	.173
† – Conference champion y – Invited to the NCAA tournament

The 1991 UCLA Bruins softball team represented the University of California, Los Angeles in the 1991 NCAA Division I softball season. The Bruins were coached by Sharron Backus, who led her seventeenth season and Sue Enquist, in her third season, in an uncommonly used co-head coach system. The Bruins played their home games at Sunset Field and finished with a record of 56–7. They competed in the Pacific-10 Conference, where they finished first with a 16–4 record.

The Bruins were invited to the 1991 NCAA Division I softball tournament, where they swept the Regional and then completed a run to the title game of the Women's College World Series where they fell to champion Arizona.

== Personnel ==
=== Roster ===
1991 UCLA Bruins roster
Pitchers: 5 – DeeDee Weiman – sophomore; 11 – Heather Compton – sophomore; 16 - Lisa Fernandez – sophomore; Catchers: 2 - Kelly Inouye – junior; 13 – Erica Ziencina – senior	Infielders: 4 – Kristy Howard – sophomore; 12 - Kerry Dienelt – senior; 15 – Missy Phillips – senior; 17 – Nichole Victoria – freshman	Outfielders: 7 – Shanna Flynn – senior; 8 – Yvonne Gutierrez – junior; 19 – Bea Chivaravanont – senior; Unknown: - Nicole Anderson; - Jennifer Caporale; - Lorraine Maynez

=== Coaches ===
1991 UCLA Bruins softball coaching staff
- Sharron Backus - co-Head coach - 17th season
- Sue Enquist - co-Head coach - 3rd season
- Kirk Walker - Assistant Coach - 2nd season

== Schedule ==
Legend
	UCLA win
	UCLA loss
*	Non-Conference game

1991 UCLA Bruins softball game log
Regular season

February
Date	Opponent	Site/stadium	Score	Overall record	Pac-10 record
Feb 2	UC Santa Barbara*	Sunset Field • Los Angeles, CA	W 5–0	1–0	
Feb 2	UC Santa Barbara*	Sunset Field • Los Angeles, CA	W 2–0	2–0	
Feb 6	at Cal State Northridge*	Matador Diamond • Northridge, CA	W 4–0	3–0	
Feb 6	at Cal State Northridge*	Matador Diamond • Northridge, CA	W 3–0^{6}	4–0	
Feb 12	Long Beach State*	Sunset Field • Los Angeles, CA	W 1–0	5–0	
Feb 12	Long Beach State*	Sunset Field • Los Angeles, CA	W 7–0	6–0	
Feb 14	vs New Mexico State*	Tucson, AZ (Arizona Tournament)	W 4–0	7–0	
Feb 14	vs California*	Tucson, AZ (Arizona Tournament)	W 6–3	8–0	
Feb 15	vs Sacramento State*	Tucson, AZ (Arizona Tournament)	W 8–0^{6}	9–0	
Feb 15	vs Pacific*	Tucson, AZ (Arizona Tournament)	W 2–0	10–0	
Feb 15	vs Florida State*	Tucson, AZ (Arizona Tournament)	W 5–2	11–0	
Feb 16	vs Texas–Arlington*	Tucson, AZ (Arizona Tournament)	W 3–0	12–0	
Feb 17	vs Cal State Fullerton*	Tucson, AZ (Arizona Tournament)	W 4–0	13–0	
Feb 17	vs Oregon*	Tucson, AZ (Arizona Tournament)	W 5–1	14–0	
Feb 17	vs Arizona State*	Tucson, AZ (Arizona Tournament)	W 6–0	15–0	
Feb 26	Cal Poly Pomona*	Sunset Field • Los Angeles, CA	W 1–0	16–0	
Feb 26	Cal Poly Pomona*	Sunset Field • Los Angeles, CA	W 1–0	17–0	

March
Date	Opponent	Site/stadium	Score	Overall record	Pac-10 record
Mar 2	vs Utah*	Rebel Softball Diamond • Paradise, NV (UNLV Spring Fling)	W 5–3	18–0	
Mar 2	vs Iowa State*	Rebel Softball Diamond • Paradise, NV (UNLV Spring Fling)	W 9–0^{5}	19–0	
Mar 2	at UNLV*	Rebel Softball Diamond • Paradise, NV (UNLV Spring Fling)	W 1–0^{8}	20–0	
Mar 3	vs Ohio State*	Rebel Softball Diamond • Paradise, NV (UNLV Spring Fling)	W 2–0	21–0	
Mar 3	vs Sacramento State*	Rebel Softball Diamond • Paradise, NV (UNLV Spring Fling)	W 6–0	22–0	
Mar 7	New Mexico*	Sunset Field • Los Angeles, CA	W 7–0	23–0	
Mar 7	New Mexico*	Sunset Field • Los Angeles, CA	W 5–1	24–0	
Mar 10	San Diego State*	Sunset Field • Los Angeles, CA	W 5–0	25–0	
Mar 10	San Diego State*	Sunset Field • Los Angeles, CA	W 6–0	26–0	
Mar 25	Oregon	Sunset Field • Los Angeles, CA	W 5–0	27–0	1–0
Mar 25	Oregon	Sunset Field • Los Angeles, CA	W 10–0^{5}	28–0	2–0
Mar 26	Oregon State	Sunset Field • Los Angeles, CA	W 10–0^{5}	29–0	3–0
Mar 28	vs Sacramento State*	Wahine Softball Field • Honolulu, HI (Hawaii Tournament)	W 8–0	30–0	
Mar 28	vs UC Santa Barbara*	Wahine Softball Field • Honolulu, HI (Hawaii Tournament)	W 5–4	31–0	
Mar 29	at Hawaii*	Wahine Softball Field • Honolulu, HI (Hawaii Tournament)	W 3–0	32–0	
Mar 30	vs UC Santa Barbara*	Wahine Softball Field • Honolulu, HI (Hawaii Tournament)	L 0–1^{9}	32–1	
Mar 30	vs Sacramento State*	Wahine Softball Field • Honolulu, HI (Hawaii Tournament)	W 10–1	33–1	

April
Date	Opponent	Site/stadium	Score	Overall record	Pac-10 record
Apr 6	Arizona	Sunset Field • Los Angeles, CA	W 3–0	34–1	4–0
Apr 6	Arizona	Sunset Field • Los Angeles, CA	W 5–0	35–1	5–0
Apr 8	Arizona State	Sunset Field • Los Angeles, CA	W 3–0	36–1	6–0
Apr 8	Arizona State	Sunset Field • Los Angeles, CA	W 2–0	37–1	7–0
Apr 12	at California	Strawberry Field • Berkeley, CA	L 0–2	37–2	7–1
Apr 12	at California	Strawberry Field • Berkeley, CA	L 0–1^{11}	37–3	7–2
Apr 13	at Sacramento State*	Shea Stadium • Sacramento, CA	W 1–0	38–3	
Apr 13	at Sacramento State*	Shea Stadium • Sacramento, CA	W 5–1	39–3	
Apr 16	at Cal Poly Pomona*	Pomona, CA	W 3–2	40–3	
Apr 16	at Cal Poly Pomona*	Pomona, CA	W 8–0	41–3	
Apr 20	at Oregon State	Corvallis, OR	W 7–1	42–3	8–2
Apr 20	at Oregon State	Corvallis, OR	W 6–0	43–3	9–2
Apr 20	at Oregon State	Corvallis, OR	W 3–0	44–3	10–2
Apr 21	at Oregon	Howe Field • Eugene, OR	W 7–0	45–3	11–2
Apr 21	at Oregon	Howe Field • Eugene, OR	W 4–0	46–3	12–2
Apr 26	California	Sunset Field • Los Angeles, CA	W 1–0	47–3	13–2
Apr 26	California	Sunset Field • Los Angeles, CA	W 1–0^{8}	48–3	14–2

May
Date	Opponent	Site/stadium	Score	Overall record	Pac-10 record
May 4	at Arizona State	Tempe, AZ	L 1–2^{8}	48–4	14–3
May 4	at Arizona State	Tempe, AZ	W 4–3	49–4	15–3
May 5	at Arizona	Tucson, AZ	W 2–1^{8}	50–4	16–3
May 5	at Arizona	Tucson, AZ	L 0–1	50–5	16–4

Postseason

NCAA Regional
Date	Opponent	Site/stadium	Score	Overall record	NCAAT record
May 17	Long Beach State	Sunset Field • Los Angeles, CA	W 1–0	51–5	1–0
May 18	Long Beach State	Sunset Field • Los Angeles, CA	W 2–0	52–5	2–0

NCAA Women's College World Series
Date	Opponent	Site/stadium	Score	Overall record	WCWS Record
May 23	Florida State	ASA Hall of Fame Stadium • Oklahoma City, OK	W 1–0	53–5	1–0
May 24	Arizona	ASA Hall of Fame Stadium • Oklahoma City, OK	L 0–1^{9}	53–6	1–1
May 25	Missouri	ASA Hall of Fame Stadium • Oklahoma City, OK	W 5–0	54–6	2–1
May 25	Long Beach State	ASA Hall of Fame Stadium • Oklahoma City, OK	W 1–0^{11}	55–6	4–0
May 26	Fresno State	ASA Hall of Fame Stadium • Oklahoma City, OK	W 5–1^{13}	56–6	4–1
May 26	Arizona	ASA Hall of Fame Stadium • Oklahoma City, OK	L 1–5	56–7	4–2
