= Phil McSpadden =

American softball coach

Current position
- Title: Head coach

Coaching career (HC unless noted)
- 1988–present: Oklahoma City University

Head coaching record
- Overall: 1,860–404 (.822)

Phil McSpadden is an American softball coach. With a record of 1,860–404, he has more wins than any other coach in the history of college softball. He has led the Oklahoma City University softball team to eleven NAIA national titles in 1994, 1995, 1996, 1997, 2000, 2001, 2002, 2007, 2016, 2017, and 2022. He was inducted into the National Fastpitch Coaches Association Hall of Fame in 2014.

== See also ==
- National Fastpitch Coaches Association Hall of Fame
- List of college softball coaches with 1,000 wins
