= George Wares =

American softball coach

Current position
- Title: Head coach
- Team: Central (IA)
- Conference: American Rivers
- Record: 1,321-477-3

Biographical details
- Education: Central College (Iowa)

Coaching career (HC unless noted)

Softball
- 1985-present: Central (IA)

Head coaching record
- Overall: 1,321–477–3 (.734)

Accomplishments and honors

Championships
- 4× NCAA Division III National Champion (1988, 1991, 1993, 2003); 14× IIAC/A-R-C regular season; 5× IIAC/A-R-C tournament (1985, 1986, 2012, 2015, 2019)

Awards
- National Fastpitch Coaches Association Hall of Fame (2007); 10× IIAC/A-R-C Coach of the Year; NFCA DIII Regional Coach of the Year (2001); NFCA DIII National Coach of the Year (2003); Winningest softball coach in NCAA DIII History

George Wares is an American softball coach. In 39 years as the head coach of Central (IA) softball, (1985–present), he has won more games in NCAA DIII than any other coach with 1232. He has led the Dutch to 4 NCAA DIII softball national championships, the last in 2003.

== Coaching career ==
Wares became the head softball coach of the Central Dutch in 1985, becoming the 3rd coach in the programs history. In just his second year at the helm Wares piloted his team to an NCAA Runner-up finish in 1996. He has taken his team to the NCAA DIII softball college world series and astounding 12 times. In 1988 Wares won his first NCAA national title and would go on to win 3 more, his most recent in 2003.

== Head coaching record ==
Record table
Season	Team	Overall	Conference	Standing	Postseason
Central Dutch (American Rivers Conference) (1985–present)
1985	Central (IA)	19–14	7–5	4th	
1986	Central (IA)	35–20–1	11–3	T-1st	College World Series Runner-up
1987	Central (IA)	33–10	11–3	2nd	College World Series
1988	Central (IA)	35–10	11–4	T-3rd	College World Series Champion
1989	Central (IA)	36–11	12–4	2nd	College World Series
1990	Central (IA)	32–15	14–2	1st	College World Series
1991	Central (IA)	42–6	15–1	1st	College World Series Champion
1992	Central (IA)	31–11	12–3	T-2nd	NCAA Regional
1993	Central (IA)	38–2	14–0	1st	College World Series Champion
1994	Central (IA)	35–14	11–5	T–3rd	College World Series
1995	Central (IA)	35–13	13–3	2nd	College World Series
1996	Central (IA)	39–15	13–3	1st	NCAA Regional
1997	Central (IA)	35–12	11–3	2nd	College World Series
1998	Central (IA)	30–15	14–4	2nd	NCAA Regional
1999	Central (IA)	34–11–1	16–4	2nd	NCAA Regional
2000	Central (IA)	40–10	17–3	T-1st	NCAA Regional
2001	Central (IA)	41–10	16–4	2nd	College World Series Runner-up
2002	Central (IA)	36–5	16–2	1st	NCAA Regional
2003	Central (IA)	41–5–1	14–2–1	1st	College World Series Champion
2004	Central (IA)	35–9	13–3	1st	NCAA Regional
2005	Central (IA)	28–12	12–4	3rd	
2006	Central (IA)	33–13	12–4	3rd	NCAA Regional
2007	Central (IA)	27–13	9–7	5th	
2008	Central (IA)	24–16	8–8	5th	
2009	Central (IA)	36–8	13–3	1st	NCAA Regional
2010	Central (IA)	30–14	12–4	3rd	NCAA Regional
2011	Central (IA)	39–9	14–2	T-1st	NCAA Regional
2012	Central (IA)	36–10	12–4	2nd	NCAA Regional
2013	Central (IA)	32–10	12–2	T-1st	NCAA Regional
2014	Central (IA)	30–12	10–4	T–2nd	NCAA Regional
2015	Central (IA)	34–12	9–3	T-2nd	NCAA Super Regional
2016	Central (IA)	23–15	8–6	4th	
2017	Central (IA)	32–10	13–3	2nd	NCAA Regional
2018	Central (IA)	29–12	12–4	2nd	NCAA Regional
2019	Central (IA)	27–10	12–4	1st	NCAA Regional
2020	Central (IA)	6–1	0–0		Season cancelled due to COVID-19
2021	Central (IA)	20–14	15–9	3rd	
2022	Central (IA)	21–17	7–9	T-7th	
2023	Central (IA)	33–11	11–5	3rd	NCAA Regional
2024	Central (IA)	33–13	13–3	1st	NCAA Super Regional
2025	Central (IA)	26–13	9–7	5th	NCAA Regional
2026	Central (IA)	30–14	9–7	T-4th	NCAA Regional
Central (IA):		1,321–477–3 (.734)	493–163–1 (.751)		
Total:		1,321–477–3 (.734)			
National champion Postseason invitational champion Conference regular season champion Conference regular season and conference tournament champion Division regular season champion Division regular season and conference tournament champion Conference tournament champion

== See also ==
- List of college softball coaches with 1,000 wins
- National Fastpitch Coaches Association Hall of Fame
