= Donna J. Papa =

American softball coach (born 1956)

Donna Papa
Biographical details
- Born: March 16, 1956 (age 70); Waterbury, Connecticut, U.S.

Playing career
- 1976–1979: Connecticut

Coaching career (HC unless noted)

Softball
- 1980: UNC Greensboro (assistant)
- 1981–1983: St. John's (assistant)
- 1984–1985: Susquehanna
- 1986–2023: North Carolina

Volleyball
- 1984–1985: Susquehanna

Head coaching record
- Overall: 1368–805–4 (.629) (softball)

Accomplishments and honors

Championships
- Softball; 5 ACC regular season (1996, 1998, 2000, 2008, 2012); 1 ACC tournament (2001)

Awards
- Softball; 5× ACC Coach of the Year (1996, 1998, 2000, 2008, 2012); National Fastpitch Coaches Association Hall of Fame (2012)

Donna Jean Papa (born March 16, 1956) is an American softball coach. With a record of 1,368–805–4, she ranks 7th in wins in the history of college softball. She was the head coach at the University of North Carolina from 1986-2023. She was inducted into the National Fastpitch Coaches Association Hall of Fame.

== Coaching career ==
=== North Carolina ===
On May 25, 2023, after 38 years at the helm, Donna Papa retired as head coach of the North Carolina softball team.

== Head coaching record ==
=== Softball ===
Record table
Season	Team	Overall	Conference	Standing	Postseason
Susquehanna (Middle Atlantic Conferences) (1984–1985)
1984	Susquehanna	13–7	3–3		
1985	Susquehanna	16–8	7–1		
Susquehanna:		29–15 (.659)	10–4 (.714)		
North Carolina Tar Heels (Independent) (1986–1991)
1986	North Carolina	35–13			
1987	North Carolina	36–11			
1988	North Carolina	25–23			
1989	North Carolina	35–17			
1990	North Carolina	38–18			
1991	North Carolina	36–12			
North Carolina Tar Heels (Atlantic Coast Conference) (1992–present)
1992	North Carolina	45–18	3–4	3rd	
1993	North Carolina	42–17	3–1	2nd	
1994	North Carolina	32–25	2–4	3rd	
1995	North Carolina	25–34	1–5	4th	
1996	North Carolina	33–29–1	6–1	1st	
1997	North Carolina	21–34	2–6	5th	
1998	North Carolina	32–21	6–2	1st	
1999	North Carolina	39–22	4–4	T-3rd	
2000	North Carolina	47–17	6–2	T-1st	
2001	North Carolina	38–19–1	6–2	2nd	NCAA Regional
2002	North Carolina	34–30	2–6	4th	
2003	North Carolina	40–22–1	4–3	2nd	NCAA Regional
2004	North Carolina	44–22	6–4	T-2nd	NCAA Regional
2005	North Carolina	38–29	9–9	5th	NCAA Regional
2006	North Carolina	48–19	13–7	2nd	NCAA Regional
2007	North Carolina	46–21	11–9	5th	NCAA Regional
2008	North Carolina	50–12–1	18–2	1st	NCAA Regional
2009	North Carolina	47–13	15–5	3rd	NCAA Regional
2010	North Carolina	42–20	11–10	4th	NCAA Regional
2011	North Carolina	34–21	13–7	2nd	
2012	North Carolina	43–15	13–4	1st	NCAA Regional
2013	North Carolina	40–21	13–8	T-3rd	NCAA Regional
2014	North Carolina	24–26	14–11	5th	
2015	North Carolina	37–16	16–5	2nd	NCAA Regional
2016	North Carolina	32–25	13–11	T-5th	NCAA Regional
2017	North Carolina	40–21	14–9	T-3rd	NCAA Regional
2018	North Carolina	30–26	15–8	2nd (Coastal)	
2019	North Carolina	38–20	17–7	2nd (Coastal)	NCAA Regional
2020	North Carolina	10–14	3–3	6th	Season canceled due to COVID-19
2021	North Carolina	14–26	10–19	10th	
2022	North Carolina	23–28	6–18	10th	
2023	North Carolina	26–28	13–10	6th	
North Carolina:		1339–805–4 (.624)	288–206 (.583)		
Total:		1368–805–4 (.629)			
National champion Postseason invitational champion Conference regular season champion Conference regular season and conference tournament champion Division regular season champion Division regular season and conference tournament champion Conference tournament champion

== See also ==
- List of college softball coaches with 1,000 wins
