= 1991 NAIA World Series =

1991 NAIA baseball tournament
- 1991 NAIA World Series
- Teams: 10
- Format: Double elimination Page playoff
- Finals site: Harris Field; Lewiston, Idaho
- Champions: Lewis–Clark State (7th title)
- Winning coach: Ed Cheff
- MVP: Greg Umfleet (DH) (Lewis–Clark State)

The 1991 NAIA World Series was the 35th annual tournament hosted by the National Association of Intercollegiate Athletics to determine the national champion of baseball among its member colleges and universities in the United States and Canada.

The tournament was played at Harris Field in Lewiston, Idaho.

Hometown team and four-time defending champions Lewis–Clark State (48–7) defeated Oral Roberts (60–15) in a single-game championship series, 7–0, to win the Warriors' seventh NAIA World Series. This would go on to be the fifth of six consecutive World Series championships for the program.

Lewis–Clark State designated hitter Greg Umfleet was named tournament MVP.

== Bracket ==
=== Preliminary bracket ===
First round
Grand View	3
North Florida	4
Lewis–Clark State	9
Lubbock Christian	4
Consolation First Round
Point Park	13
Lubbock Christian	14
Spring Arbor	4
Grand View	7

Second round
Southern Arkansas	6
North Florida	7
Hawaii Pacific	7
Spring Arbor	4
Oral Roberts	8
Lewis–Clark State	13
Point Park	3
USC Aiken	5
Consolation Second Round
Southern Arkansas	4
Lubbock Christian	9
Oral Roberts	6
Grand View	0

Third round
North Florida	8
Hawaii Pacific	7
Lewis–Clark State	19
USC Aiken	6
Consolation Third Round (both teams to Semifinals)
Hawaii Pacific	8
Lubbock Christian	4
USC Aiken	2
Oral Roberts	3

Fourth round (both teams to Semifinals)
North Florida	3
Lewis–Clark State	11

=== Championship bracket ===
Semifinals
Lewis–Clark State	11
Hawaii Pacific	4
North Florida	2
Oral Roberts	3

Championship
Lewis–Clark State	7
Oral Roberts	0

== See also ==
- 1991 NCAA Division I baseball tournament
- 1991 NCAA Division II baseball tournament
- 1991 NCAA Division III baseball tournament
- 1991 NAIA Softball World Series
