= Eugene Lenti =

American softball coach (born 1957)

Current position
- Title: Assistant coach
- Team: Auburn
- Conference: SEC

Biographical details
- Born: June 18, 1957 (age 69); Chicago, Illinois, U.S.
- Education: DePaul

Coaching career (HC unless noted)
- 1979–1987 1990–2018: DePaul Blue Demons; DePaul Blue Demons
- 2020–present: Auburn (assistant)

Head coaching record
- Overall: 1,300-656-6 (.664)

Eugene Lenti (born June 18, 1957) is an American softball coach who is currently an assistant coach at Auburn. He was the head coach for the DePaul Blue Demons softball team for 35 years, starting in the position in 1980. He has compiled a record of 1,236-604-6 at DePaul and has had four seasons (1999, 2001, 2002, and 2008) in which his teams have won more than 50 games. As of May 2015, he ranked seventh in wins in the history of college softball.

He has been inducted into the National Fastpitch Coaches Association Hall of Fame. Lenti and his staff were named National Fastpitch Coaches Association Mideast Region Staff of the Year in 2017.

== Coaching career ==
=== Auburn (asst.) ===
On June 14, 2019, Lenti was announced as an assistant coach of the Auburn softball program.

== See also ==
- National Fastpitch Coaches Association Hall of Fame
- List of college softball coaches with 1,000 wins
