= 1991 NCAA Division II softball tournament =

- Format: Double-elimination tournament
- Finals site: Midland, Michigan
- Champions: Augustana (SD) (1st title)
- Runner-up: Bloomsburg (1st title game)
- Winning coach: Sandy Jerstad (1st title)
- Attendance: 4,134

The 1991 NCAA Division II softball tournament was the tenth annual postseason tournament hosted by the NCAA to determine the national champion of softball among its Division II members in the United States, held at the end of the 1991 NCAA Division II softball season.

The final, four-team double elimination tournament, also known as the Division II Women's College World Series, was played in Midland, Michigan.

Augustana (SD) defeated Bloomsburg in a single game championship series, 3–2 (after 10 innings), to capture the Vikings' first Division II national title.

== Bracket ==
=== Finals ===
First Round
Bloomsburg	1
Augustana (SD)	3
SE Missouri State	2
Portland State	3
Bloomsburg	9
SE Missouri State	4
Consolation bracket

Semifinals
Augustana (SD)	3^{(16)}
Portland State	2
Portland State	2
Bloomsburg	5^{(9)}

Championship
Augustana (SD)	3^{(10)}
Bloomsburg	2

== All-tournament team ==
- Ferris Grund, 1B, Augustana (SD)
- Julie Wolfe, 2B, Bloomsburg
- Kim Kouri, SS, Augustana (SD)
- Michele Hughes, SS, Portland State
- Karen Hudson, 3B, Southeast Missouri State
- Kim Sudbeck, OF, Augustana (SD)
- Jean Buskirk, OF, Bloomsburg
- Cathy Eason, OF, Portland State
- Cynthia Macom, OF, Portland State
- Julie Krauth, P, Augustana (SD)
- Kristin Jacobs, P, Portland State
- Kathy Orstad, C, Augustana (SD)
- Lori Shelly, DP, Bloomsburg

== See also ==
- 1991 NCAA Division I softball tournament
- 1991 NCAA Division III softball tournament
- 1991 NAIA softball tournament
- 1991 NCAA Division II baseball tournament
