= Gayle Blevins =

American softball coach

Biographical details
- Born: c. 1953 (age 72–73); Dayton, Ohio, U.S.

Coaching career (HC unless noted)
- 1980–1987: Indiana
- 1988–2010: Iowa

Head coaching record
- Overall: 1,245–588–5

Lizabeth Gayle Blevins (born c. 1953) is an American former college softball coach. She was the head coach at Indiana University Bloomington from 1980 to 1987 and at the University of Iowa from 1988 to 2010. With 1,245 wins in 31 years as a head coach, Blevins ranks 17th all-time in NCAA Division I softball coaching victories.

== Early years ==
Blevins is a native of Dayton, Ohio. She attended Wilbur Wright High School and graduated from the University of Dayton in 1973.

== Indiana University ==
Blevins was the head softball coach at Indiana University from 1980 to 1987. She led the Hoosiers to Big Ten Conference softball titles in 1980, 1983 and 1986. She had two 45-win seasons in 1982 and 1986 and a 47-win season in 1984. In 1986, she was named NCAA Division I Coach of the Year by the National Softball Coaches Association after her Indiana Hoosiers team finished in third place in the Women's College World Series. In eight years as the head coach at Indiana, Blevins compiled a record of 300 wins, 146 losses and 2 ties for a .672 winning percentage.

== University of Iowa ==
In July 1987, Blevins accepted the head coaching job at the University of Iowa. She was the head softball coach at Iowa for 23 years from 1988 to 2010. Blevins won 40 or more games in 13 of her 23 years at Iowa, including a career-high 53 wins in 1991, 52 wins in 1997 and 50 wins in 2005. She also led the Hawkeyes to 16 NCAA tournaments, four Women's College World Series appearances, five Big Ten regular season championships, and two Big Ten Tournament titles.

== Coaching records and Halls of Fame ==
Blevins announced her retirement in June 2010. In 31 years as a head coach, Blevins compiled a record of 1,245 wins, 588 losses and 5 ties. At the time of her retirement, Blevins was the second-winningest softball coach in NCAA Division I history. She never had a losing season at Iowa or Indiana.

Blevins was inducted into the National Fastpitch Coaches Association Hall of Fame in 1999, and the Indiana University Hall of Fame in 2005. She was also inducted into the Iowa Athletics Hall of Fame in 2016.

== See also ==
- National Fastpitch Coaches Association Hall of Fame
- List of college softball coaches with 1,000 wins
