= 1991 NCAA Division II baseball tournament =

- Season: 1991
- Finals site: Paterson Field; Montgomery, Alabama
- Champions: Jacksonville State (2nd title)
- Runner-up: Missouri Southern State (1st CWS Appearance)
- Winning coach: Rudy Abbott (2nd title)
- MOP: Tim Van Egmond (P) (Jacksonville State)
- Attendance: 15,400

The 1991 NCAA Division II baseball tournament was the postseason tournament hosted by the NCAA to determine the national champion of baseball among its Division II colleges and universities at the end of the 1991 NCAA Division II baseball season.

The final, eight-team double-elimination tournament was played at Paterson Field in Montgomery, Alabama.

Defending champions Jacksonville State defeated Missouri Southern State, 20–4, in the championship game, claiming the Gamecocks' second Division II national title.

== Bracket ==
=== College World Series ===
First Round
American International	4
Florida Southern	5
Longwood	3
Missouri Southern State	6
American International	5
Longwood	8
Jacksonville State	6
Shippensburg	5
UC Riverside	2
SIU Edwardsville	5
Shippensburg	3
UC Riverside	8

Second Round
Florida Southern	4
Missouri Southern State	5
Longwood	11
Florida Southern	6
Jacksonville State	15
SIU Edwardsville	1
UC Riverside	16
SIU Edwardsville	4

Semifinals
Missouri Southern State	8	9
Longwood	11	6
Jacksonville State	10	5
UC Riverside	12	2

Championship
Missouri Southern State	4
Jacksonville State	20

== See also ==
- 1991 NCAA Division I baseball tournament
- 1991 NCAA Division III baseball tournament
- 1991 NAIA World Series
- 1991 NCAA Division II softball tournament
