= Megan Smith (softball) =

American softball coach

Megan Smith Lyon
Current position
- Title: Head coach
- Team: North Carolina
- Conference: ACC
- Record: 70–37 (.654)

Biographical details
- Born: Walkertown, North Carolina, U.S.
- Education: North Carolina

Playing career
- 1996–1999: North Carolina
- Position: Third baseman

Coaching career (HC unless noted)
- 2000–2002: Young Harris
- 2003: Charlotte (asst.)
- 2004: North Carolina (asst.)
- 2005–2006: Western Carolina
- 2007–2009: LSU (asst.)
- 2010–2018: Kansas
- 2019–2023: Marshall
- 2024–Present: North Carolina

Head coaching record
- Overall: 623–372 (.626)

Accomplishments and honors

Championships
- SoCon Regular Season Champions (2006)

Awards
- SoCon Coach of the Year (2006)

Megan Smith Lyon is an American softball coach who is the current head coach at North Carolina.

== Coaching career ==
=== Western Carolina ===
On July 27, 2004, Megan Smith was hired as the first coach of the Western Carolina softball program, which would begin play in 2006. On October 2, 2006, Megan Smith resigned as head coach of Western Carolina after the inaugural season for the Catamounts.

=== Kansas ===
On June 24, 2009, Smith was announced as the new head coach of the Kansas softball program. On July 25, 2019, Smith announced that she was leaving the program to be the head coach at Marshall.

=== Marshall ===
On July 25, 2018, Smith was announced as the new head coach of the Marshall softball program.

== Head coaching record ==
=== College ===
Record table
Season	Team	Overall	Conference	Standing	Postseason
Young Harris Mountain Lions (Peach Belt Conference) (2001–2002)
2001	Young Harris	34–25			NJCAA Regional Runner-up
2002	Young Harris	45–16			NJCAA Regional Runner-up
Young Harris:		79–41 (.658)			
Western Carolina (Southern Conference) (2006)
2006	Western Carolina	41–20	16–4	1st	
Western Carolina:		41–20 (.672)	16–4 (.800)		
Kansas Jayhawks (Big 12 Conference) (2010–2018)
2010	Kansas	21–35	2–16	10th	
2011	Kansas	31–22	2–16	10th	
2012	Kansas	31–20	6–17	8th	
2013	Kansas	34–16	9–8	4th	
2014	Kansas	34–23	7–11	5th	NCAA Regional
2015	Kansas	40–15	8–10	5th	NCAA Regional
2016	Kansas	31–20	8–9	4th	
2017	Kansas	24–28	3–14	7th	
2018	Kansas	27–25	2–16	7th	
Kansas:		273–204 (.572)	47–117 (.287)		
Marshall Thundering Herd (Conference USA) (2019–Present)
2019	Marshall	42–22	17–7	2nd (East)	NISC Regional Finals
2020	Marshall	18–7			Season canceled due to the COVID-19 pandemic
2021	Marshall	20–13	8–8	4th (East)	
2022	Marshall	35–18	15–9	2nd (East)	
Marshall Thundering Herd (Sun Belt Conference) (2023)
2023	Marshall	45–10	17–5	3rd, (1st East)	
Marshall:		160–70 (.696)	70–32 (.686)		
North Carolina Tar Heels (Atlantic Coast Conference) (2024–present)
2024	North Carolina	30–20	10–14	7th	
2025	North Carolina	40–17	15–9	6th	NCAA Regional
North Carolina:		70–37 (.654)	25–23 (.521)		
Total:		623–372 (.626)			
National champion Postseason invitational champion Conference regular season champion Conference regular season and conference tournament champion Division regular season champion Division regular season and conference tournament champion Conference tournament champion
