= Florida Atlantic Owls softball =

- University: Florida Atlantic University
- Head coach: Jordan Clark (2nd season)
- Conference: The American
- Location: Boca Raton, Florida, US
- Home stadium: Joan Joyce Field (capacity: 700)
- Nickname: Owls
- Colors: Blue and red

NCAA Tournament appearances
- 1999, 2000, 2001, 2002, 2003, 2004, 2006, 2015, 2016, 2024, 2025

Conference tournament championships
- Atlantic Sun; 1997, 1998, 1999, 2000, 2001, 2002, 2003, 2004, 2006 Sun Belt; 2007 C-USA; 2016

Regular-season conference championships
- Atlantic Sun; 1997, 1998, 1999, 2000, 2001, 2002, 2003, 2004 Sun Belt; 2007 C-USA; 2016, 2018 AAC; 2024, 2025

The Florida Atlantic Owls are the college softball team of Florida Atlantic University.

== History ==
For the relatively young program (first fielding a team in 1995), the Florida Atlantic University softball team has been overwhelmingly successful under the leadership of former head coach, Joan Joyce. In twelve seasons of competition in the Atlantic Sun Conference (from 1995 to 2006), the Lady Owls won the conference championship nine times, including eight consecutive championships from 1997 through 2004. The Owls added their tenth conference championship in their first season in the Sun Belt Conference in 2007. The team currently participates in the American Conference and is led by head coach Jordan Clark.

On March 18, 2022, Joyce earned her 1,000th career win as a head coach, becoming the 27th NCAA Division I softball coach to reach the milestone. She died on March 26, 2022. The field was renamed in her honor on April 26, 2023.

== See also ==
- List of NCAA Division I softball programs
