= Rudy Abbott =

American baseball coach (1940–2022)

Biographical details
- Born: December 29, 1940; Anniston, Alabama, U.S.
- Died: February 9, 2022 (aged 81); Jacksonville, Alabama, U.S.
- Education: Jones Junior College

Coaching career (HC unless noted)
- 1970–2001: Jacksonville State

Head coaching record
- Overall: 1003–467

Accomplishments and honors

Championships
- 2x NCAA Division II tournament (1990, 1991)

Awards
- 2x NCAA Division II National Coach of the Year (1990, 1991); 5x GSC Coach of the Year; 1x TAAC Coach of the Year

Rudy Vallee Abbott (December 29, 1940 – February 9, 2022) was an American college baseball coach who served as head coach of the Jacksonville State Gamecocks baseball team from 1970 to 2001. His all-time record is 1003–467 (.682).

== Coaching career ==
Abbott coached the Jacksonville State baseball teams to NCAA Division II national champions in 1990 and 1991. Seven of his Jacksonville State baseball teams advanced to the NCAA Division II World Series. In 1979, his team started the season with a 29–0 record, an NCAA record for the best start in history. He was named Division II Coach of the Year in 1990. In Division I, he was named the TAAC Coach of the Year in 1997.

As of 2013, Abbott's 1,003 wins placed him ninth on the all-time NCAA list for coaches in Division II.

== Personal life and death ==
Abbott was hospitalized with COVID-19 related pneumonia in February 2022. He died on February 9, at the age of 81, in Jacksonville, Alabama.
