= National Fastpitch Coaches Association Hall of Fame =

Hall of fame for softpitch softball

Coordinates: 38.249°N 85.693°W

- Description: Hall of fame recognizing coaches who have made extraordinary contributions to the sport of fastpitch softball
- Country: United States
- Presented by: National Fastpitch Coaches Association

The National Fastpitch Coaches Association Hall of Fame was established in 1991 to recognize coaches who have made extraordinary contributions to the sport of softpitch softball. The National Fastpitch Coaches Association ("NFCA") is a professional organization for fastpitch softball coaches from all competitive levels of play. As of 2023, 95 individuals have been inducted into the NFCA Hall of Fame.

== Inductees ==
Name	Inducted	Wins	Losses	Ties	Pct.	Teams
Sharon Backus	1991	854	173	3	.831	UCLA 1975–1996
Linda Wells	1991	914	679	1	.574	Minnesota 1975–1989; Arizona State 1990–2005
Linda Draft	1991	357	233	2	.605	Wisconsin-Parkside 1978–1992
Lorene Ramsey	1992	840	309		.731	Illinois Central 1968–1995
June Walker	1992	721	154		.824	The College of New Jersey 1974–1995
Judy Sherman	1992	298	117		.718	Pacific (Oregon) 1979–1992
Betty Hoff	1992	521	350	1	.598	Luther College (Iowa) 1969–2001
Judy Martino	1993				.	South Carolina 1979–1981; North Carolina; NFCA founder
Judi Garman	1993	1124	416	4	.	Golden West College 1972–1979; Cal State Fullerton 1980–1999
Sharon Drysdale	1994	704	529	3	.571	Kansas 1973–1975; Northwestern University 1979–2001
Carol Spanks	1994	688	375	6	.646	Cal Poly Pomona 1979–1993; UNLV 1995–1997
Mary Littlewood	1995	648	202		.762	Arizona State 1971–1989
Gerry Pinkston	1995	418	271	1	.607	Central Oklahoma 1976–1997
Mike Candrea	1996	1257	265	2	.825	Arizona 1986–2011 (stats through March 26, 2011)
Connie Claussen	1996				.	Nebraska at Omaha 1969–1976
Mary Nutter	1997				.	
Marge Willadsen	1997	569	447	2	.560	Buena Vista 1981–2008
Kathy Veroni	1998	869	598	2	.592	Western Illinois 1973–2005
Dianne Baker	1998	785	462	3	.629	Stephen F. Austin 1981–1995; Texas Woman's 1997–2005
Rayla Allison	1999	213	185		.535	Pioneer category (coach at Texas–Arlington 1985–1989; Hawaii 1990–1991; first full-time Executive Director of the NFCA 1991–1994)
Gayle Blevins	1999	1245	588	5	.679	Indiana 1980–1987; Iowa 1988–2010
Sandy Jerstad	2000	1011	359	2	.738	Augustana (South Dakota) 1977–2003
Margie Wright	2000	1403	508	3	.734	Illinois State 1980–1985; Fresno State 1986–2010 (stats through March 25, 2011)
Fran Ebert	2000				.	
Cindy Bristow	2001				.	International Softball Federation; Arizona State; New Mexico State; Wichita State
Bill Galloway	2001	881	390	2	.693	Texas A&M 1979–1981; Louisiana Tech 1982–2002
Joyce Compton	2002	1066	563	3	.	Missouri 1983–1986; South Carolina 1987–2010 (stats through 2010)
Margo F. Jonker	2003	1007	599	5	.	Central Michigan 1980–2010 (stats through 2010)
JoAnne Graf	2003	1186	425	6	.735	Florida State 1984–2008
Celeste Knierim	2003	1043	542		.658	St. Louis Community College-Meramec
Jan Hutchinson	2004	1215	288	2	.	Bloomsburg 1978–2010
Elaine Sortino	2004	1099	451	6	.	University of Massachusetts Amherst 1980–2010 (stats through 2010)
Yvette Girouard	2005	1263	415	1	.753	University of Louisiana at Lafayette 1981–2000; LSU 2001–2010 (stats through March 26, 2011)
Scott Whitlock	2005	901	229		.	Kennesaw State 1991–2010 (stats through 2010)
Liz Miller	2005	377	156		.707	Notre Dame 1993–2001
Sue Enquist	2006	887	175	1	.835	UCLA 1989–2006
Clyde Washburne	2006	284	110	1	.720	Eastern Connecticut State 1977–1987, 1993
Carol Hutchins	2006	1209	414	4	.744	Ferris State 1981–82, Michigan 1985–2011 (stats through March 26, 2011)
Henry Christowski	2007	451	130	2	.775	Simpson College 1996–2009 (stats through 2009)
Judy Groff	2007	924	581	5	.614	American International College (Mass.) 1969–2009 (stats through 2009)
George Wares	2007	840	280	3	.749	Central College (Iowa) 1985–2009 (stats through 2009)
Gary Torgeson	2008	636	216	7	.774	Cal State Northridge 1982–1994
Jay Miller	2008	954	607		.611	Purdue 1980–1981; Oklahoma City 1985–1987; Missouri 1988–2002; Mississippi State 2003–2009 (stats through 2009)
Eugene Lenti	2008	1022	494	6	.673	DePaul 1980–2009 (stats through 2009)
Donna Newberry	2008	884	398	1	.689	Muskingum 1975–2009 (stats through 2009)
Sandy Fischer	2008	853	358	3	.704	Oklahoma State 1979–2001
Gary Bryce	2008	925	577	6	.615	Wayne State 1982–2009 (stats through 2009)
Diane Ninemire	2009	970	477		.670	California 1988–2009 (stats through 2009)
Frank Cheek	2009	1049	288	2	.	Humboldt State 1989–2010 (stats through 2010)
Bill Edwards	2009	721	351	3	.672	Hofstra 1990–2009 (stats through 2009)
Chris Bellotto	2010	1042	323		.	Florida Southern College 1985–2010 (stats through 2010)
Rhonda Revelle	2010	658	358		.648	Nebraska Wesleyan 1987; Nebraska 1993–2009 (stats through 2009)
Melinda Fischer	2010	817	554	4	.596	Eastern Illinois 1978–1979; Illinois State 1986–2009
Deb Pallozzi	2011	734	354	1	.674	Rensselaer 1986–1988; Ithaca College 1988–present
Ralph Weekly	2011	1165	381	2	.753	Pacific Lutheran 1985–1994; UTC 1994–1998; Tennessee 2002–present
Mark Eldridge	2012	1083	304	6	.780	Palomar Junior College 1978–2006, 2009–10
Patty Gasso	2012	1140	355	3	.762	Long Beach City College 1991–94; Oklahoma 1995–present
Donna Papa	2012	1118	616	5	.643	Susquehanna University 1984–85; North Carolina 1986–present
Rick Bertagnolli	2013	1004	284		.780	California University of Pennsylvania 1994–present
Joan Joyce	2013	780	493		.613	Florida Atlantic University 1995–present
Lori Meyer	2013	1010	602	3	.625	Minnesota State University Mankato 1985–present
Patrick Murphy	2013	870	246		.780	Northwest Missouri State 1995; University of Alabama 1999–present
Lacy Lee Baker	2014					Executive Director of the NFCA, 1994–present
Julie Lenhart	2014	785	332	2	.702	Wisconsin-Platteville 1990–94; SUNY Cortland 1995–present
Phil McSpadden	2014	1,413	357		.798	Oklahoma City University 1988–present
Les Stuedeman	2014	894	278	1	.763	University of Alabama-Huntsville 1996–present
Jo Evans	2015	1,102	574	2	.657	Colorado State 1986–89, Utah 1990–96, Texas A&M 1997–present,
Anita Kibicka	2015	829	317	2	.723	Montclair State 1991–present
Clint Myers	2015	1,064	187	1	.850	Central Arizona College 1987–95, Arizona State 2006–13, Auburn University 2014–present
Bob Brock	2016	1,114	719	1	.608	Baylor 1980–81, Texas A&M 1982–1996, Sam Houston State 2002–present
Jacquie Joseph	2016					Bowling Green 1989–1993, Michigan State 1994–present, Inducted as member of Pioneer Category
Mona Stevens	2016	281	239	1	.541	Utah 1997–2005; Inducted as member of Pioneer Category
John Tschida	2016	856	157		.845	St. Mary's University 1995–2000, University of St. Thomas 2001–present
Karen Mullins	2017	872	636	5	.578	Connecticut 1984–2014
Vickee Kazee-Hollifield	2017	1161	410	1	.738	Carson-Newman 1986–2018
Gary Haning	2017					OC Batbusters OC Batbusters
Sheilah Gulas	2017	929	487	1	.656	Allegheny College 1987–1990, Wittenberg 1991–1996, Ashland 1997–2017
Karen Weekly	2018	1073	356	2	.750	UT-Chattanooga 1997–2001; Tennessee 2002–present
Mike Lambros	2018	878	110		.889	North Davidson High School 1980–2017
Margie Knight	2018	805	193	2	.806	North Caroline High School 1983–1996; Salisbury University 1997–present
Anthony Larezza	2019					Immaculate Heart Academy (N.J.) 2005–2015
Brad Pickler	2019					Cypress College 1987–present
Dee Abrahamson	2019					NCAA 1996–2015; Northern Illinois University 1980–1994; Lincoln Trail Community College; Inducted as member of Pioneer Category
Donna Fields	2020					St. Mary's University 1998–present
Heinz Mueller	2020					Phoenix College 1990–present
Kris Herman	2020					Tufts University 1988–2003; Williams College 2004–present
Mary Higgins	2021	564	298		.654	Creighton University 1977–1993
Leslie Huntington	2021					University of Wisconsin-Eau Claire 2001–present
Kerri Blaylock	2022					Southern Illinois University Carbondale 2000–2022
Jenny Allard	2022					Harvard University 1995–present
Sandy Montgomery	2022	1051	540	2	.660	Southern Illinois University Edwardsville 1989–2018
Kim Wilson	2023	943	350	2		Washington & Jefferson College 1991–1996; Rowan University 1997–present
John Byrne	2023					Moravian University; 1994–2022
Carol Bruggeman	2023					Purdue University; 1994–2005
Lonni Alameda	2023					University of Nevada, Las Vegas 2004–2008; Florida State University 2009–present
Connie Clark	2024					University of Texas at Austin 1996–2018
Gretta Melsted	2024					Culver-Stockton 2004–06; Augustana University: 2007–present
Tim Walton	2024					Wichita State University 2003–05; University of Florida 2006–present
Lu Harris-Champer	2025	1,163	429	1	.730	Nicholls State 1996–97; Southern Miss 1998–2000; Georgia 2001–21
Judy Lawes	2025					Kutztown 1988–present
Mike Reed	2025					East Texas Baptist 2001–03; UT Tyler 1988–present
Suzy Willemssen	2025					West Springfield HS 2002–05; Chantilly HS 2006–09; Episcopal HS 2010; Lee HS 2011–18; Bishop O'Connell HS 2019–24; Virginia Glory 2010–present
Ken Eriksen	2026					South Florida 1997–present
Denny Griffin	2026					Alma College 1989–present
Kirk Walker	2026	594	490	3	.548	Oregon State 1995–2012
Veronica Wiggins	2026	726		1		Florida A&M 1990–2020

== See also ==
- National Softball Hall of Fame and Museum
