= Lori Meyer =

American softball coach

Current position
- Title: Special Assistant to the Athletic Director
- Team: Minnesota State

Biographical details
- Education: Minnesota State University, Mankato

Coaching career (HC unless noted)
- 1985–2025: Minnesota State

Head coaching record
- Overall: 1,444–769–3 (.652)

Accomplishments and honors

Championships
- NCAA Division II softball tournament (2017); 3× NCC champion (1987, 1989, 2007); 5× NSIC regular season champion (2012–2014, 2016, 2017); 4× NSIC tournament champion (2012, 2013, 2017, 2021)

Awards
- 4× NSIC Coach of the Year (2012, 2014, 2016, 2017); National Fastpitch Coaches Association Hall of Fame (2013)

Records
- Most wins by a coach in NCAA Division II (1,444)

Lori Meyer is an American former softball coach who served as the head coach for the Minnesota State Mavericks softball team for 41 years. She compiled a record of 1,444–769–3 at Minnesota State, and is the winningest coach in NCAA Division II history.

== Early life ==
Meyer attended Upper Iowa University and played volleyball, basketball and softball. She then attended Minnesota State University, Mankato where she graduated with a master's degree in physical education in 1985.

== Coaching career ==
Meyer began her coaching career at Minnesota State in 1985. She helped lead the Mavericks to three North Central Conference championships (1987, 1989, 2007) and five Northern Sun Intercollegiate Conference titles (2012, 2013, 2014, 2016 and 2017). The Mavericks also advanced to the NCAA Division II softball tournament 18 times, with three appearances in the NCAA National Championship (1987, 2011 and 2017). In 2013, she was inducted into the National Fastpitch Coaches Association Hall of Fame. On April 18, 2014, she earned her 1,000th career win, becoming the 26th coach in softball history to reach the milestone.

During the 2017 season, she led the Mavericks to a 64–7 record, and the NCAA Division II National Championship, their first championship in program history. Their 64 wins are a program record, and the second most wins in NCAA Division II history by a national champion. On March 1, 2023, she became the winningest coach in NCAA Division II history with 1,341 wins, surpassing the previous record of 1,340 wins held by Gary Bryce.

On May 16, 2025, Meyer announced her retirement as head coach of Minnesota State after 41 seasons. She finished her career with a 1,444-769-3 record and is the winningest coach in NCAA Division II history, and ranks sixth in wins in the history of college softball, regardless of division. Following her retirement she was named Special Assistant to the Athletic Director at Minnesota State.

== Head coaching record ==
Record table
Season	Team	Overall	Conference	Standing	Postseason
Minnesota State Mavericks (NCC) (1985–2008)
1985	Minnesota State	29–18		2nd	
1986	Minnesota State	27–20		2nd	
1987	Minnesota State	49–10–2		1st	NCAA Div. II Runner-up
1988	Minnesota State	27–24		4th	
1989	Minnesota State	41–15		1st	NCAA Regional
1990	Minnesota State	19–23		5th	
1991	Minnesota State	21–26		5th	
1992	Minnesota State	32–18		2nd	
1993	Minnesota State	38–18		4th	
1994	Minnesota State	38–21		4th	
1995	Minnesota State	36–20		4th	NCAA Regional
1996	Minnesota State	36–19		5th	
1997	Minnesota State	36–16		2nd	NCAA Regional
1998	Minnesota State	24–27		7th	
1999	Minnesota State	20–28		7th	
2000	Minnesota State	28–24		5th	
2001	Minnesota State	22–29		9th	
2002	Minnesota State	20–28		9th	
2003	Minnesota State	34–18–1		3rd	
2004	Minnesota State	27–28		5th	
2005	Minnesota State	29–31		3rd	
2006	Minnesota State	30–27		4th	
2007	Minnesota State	45–15		1st	NCAA Regional
2008	Minnesota State	42–16		2nd	NCAA Regional
Minnesota State Mavericks (NSIC) (2009–2025)
2009	Minnesota State	39–17		5th	NCAA Regional
2010	Minnesota State	36–15		4th	NCAA Regional
2011	Minnesota State	54–16		4th	NCAA Div. II Runner-up
2012	Minnesota State	49–10		1st	NCAA Regional
2013	Minnesota State	40–12		1st	NCAA Regional
2014	Minnesota State	43–13		1st	NCAA Regional
2015	Minnesota State	38–23		3rd	
2016	Minnesota State	45–17		1st	NCAA Regional
2017	Minnesota State	64–7		1st	NCAA Div. II Champion
2018	Minnesota State	35–19		7th	NCAA Regional
2019	Minnesota State	37–19		5th	
2020	Minnesota State	17–3			
2021	Minnesota State	40–10		2nd	NCAA Regional
2022	Minnesota State	48–14		2nd	NCAA Regional
2023	Minnesota State	31–19		4th	
2024	Minnesota State	39–16		4th	
2025	Minnesota State	39–20		2nd	NCAA Regional
Minnesota State:		1,444–769–3 (.652)			
Total:		1,444–769–3 (.652)			
National champion Postseason invitational champion Conference regular season champion Conference regular season and conference tournament champion Division regular season champion Division regular season and conference tournament champion Conference tournament champion

== See also ==
- List of college softball coaches with 1,000 wins
