= Elaine Sortino =

American softball coach

Biographical details
- Born: October 28, 1949; Yonkers, New York, U.S.
- Died: August 18, 2013 (aged 63); Hadley, Massachusetts, U.S.
- Education: SUNY Oneonta

Coaching career (HC unless noted)
- 1971–1973: Yale (asst.)
- 1980–2013: UMass

Head coaching record
- Overall: 1185–508–6 (.699)
- Tournaments: 32–43 (.427)

Accomplishments and honors

Championships
- 23× A-10 regular season (1986, 1988, 1989, 1991–2004, 2006–2010, 2012); 23× A-10 tournament (1986, 1987, 1989–1993, 1995–2003, 2005–2010, 2012)

Awards
- 11× A-10 Coach of the Year (1991–1993, 1995, 1996, 2001, 2002, 2007–2009, 2012); 6× Division I Speedline/NFCA Northeast Coaching Staff of the Year; National Fastpitch Coaches Association Hall of Fame (2004); UMass Athletic Hall of Fame (2013)

Records
- Most Atlantic 10 wins by a coach in league history (372); Most Wins by a coach at UMass (1,185)

Elaine Sortino (October 28, 1949 – August 18, 2013) was an American college softball coach. She was the head coach at UMass from 1980 to 2013. With 1,185 wins in 34 years as a head coach, Sortino ranks among the highest in NCAA Division I softball coaching victories.

== Early years ==
Sortino was a native of Yonkers, New York, and a 1971 graduate of State University of New York at Oneonta, and earned her master's degree from the University of Bridgeport in 1973. While attending Bridgeport, Sortino served as an assistant coach for Yale University's softball team from 1971 until 1973. She was inducted into the Oneonta State Athletic Hall of Fame in 1999.

== UMass ==
Sortino was the head softball coach at UMass from 1980 to 2013. The UMass Softball Complex was renamed Sortino Field in 2012. She also coached women's volleyball from 1979-1986 posting a 218-134-1 record during her tenure. She served as Associate Athletics Director and Senior Woman Administrator at the University.

== Softball Coaching records and Halls of Fame ==
Sortino was inducted into the National Fastpitch Coaches Association Hall of Fame in 2004. She led the Minutewomen to 23 Atlantic 10 titles, 21 NCAA Tournament appearances, and 3 trips to the Women's College World Series. Sortino coached a Honda Award winner, an Olympic Gold Medalist, 21 All-Americans, 15 A-10 Players of the Year, 18 A-10 Pitchers of the Year, 9 A-10 Rookies of the Year, and 133 all-conference team members. In her career, UMass posted 21 30-win seasons, seven 40-win campaign and one 50-win season.

== Later years and death ==
Sortino was diagnosed with cancer in 2011, and died of the disease August 18, 2013.

== See also ==
- National Fastpitch Coaches Association Hall of Fame
- List of college softball coaches with 1,000 wins
