= Josh Walker =

Josh Walker may refer to:

- Josh Walker (American football) (born 1991), American football guard
- Josh Walker (Australian footballer) (born 1992), Australian rules footballer
- Josh Walker (baseball) (born 1994), American baseball player
- Josh Walker (footballer, born 1989), English footballer
- Josh Walker (footballer, born 1997), English footballer

== See also ==
- Joshua Walker (disambiguation)
