= Jordan Clark (softball) =

American softball coach

Current position
- Title: Head coach
- Team: Florida Atlantic
- Conference: AAC
- Record: 121–47 (.720)

Biographical details
- Education: Miami University

Playing career
- 2009–2012: Miami (OH)

Coaching career (HC unless noted)
- 2016–2018: Arkansas (vol asst.)
- 2019–2022: Ohio State (asst.)
- 2023–Present: Florida Atlantic

Head coaching record
- Overall: 121–47 (.720)

Accomplishments and honors

Championships
- 2× AAC Regular Season Champions (2024, 2025)

Awards
- NFCA Regional Coaching Staff of the Year (2018); 2× AAC Coaching Staff of the Year (2024, 2025); AAC Coach of the Year (2025)

Jordan Clark is an American softball coach who is currently the head coach at Florida Atlantic.

== Playing career ==
=== Miami Redhawks ===
Clark played at Miami University in Oxford, Ohio from 2009-12.

As a freshman in 2009, Clark was named to the All-MAC Second Team and the All-MAC Freshman Team. She led the Redhawks in batting average (.333), at-bats (.174), hits (58), walks (20), hit-by-pitches (6), on-base percentage (.420), and stolen bases (6, tied for lead).

Clark was named to the MAC All-Tournament Team as a sophomore in 2010 after hitting .615 (8-for-13) with five RBI and four runs scored in the event. She was an honorable mention Academic All-MAC selection in 2011 and won the Nan Harvey Sportsmanship Award, as voted on by the MAC head coaches, as a senior in 2012.

== Coaching career ==
=== Arkansas ===
Clark served as a volunteer assistant coach at Arkansas from 2016-18. She helped lead the Razorbacks to consecutive trips to the NCAA tournament in 2017 and 2018 and was part of the NFCA Division 1 South Region Coaching Staff of the Year in 2018.

=== Ohio State ===
On July 12, 2018, Ohio State hired Clark as an assistant coach under Kelly Kovach Schoenly. She spent four years on the Buckeyes' coaching staff.

=== Florida Atlantic ===
On June 24, 2022, Clark was hired as head coach of the Florida Atlantic softball program.

In her first season, Clark led the Owls to 35 wins and a fourth-place finish in Conference USA. In her second season, Clark led FAU to the American regular-season title and 41 wins. The Owls were selected with an at-large bid to the NCAA tournament, reaching the postseason for the first time since 2016.

The Owls repeated as regular-season champions of The American in 2025 and reached the NCAA tournament for the second consecutive year. Clark led FAU to 45 wins, including a victory over Georgia Tech in the Gainesville Regional.

== Personal life ==
Clark is from Marion, Arkansas. She played softball, volleyball, and basketball in high school. Prior to beginning her collegiate coaching career, Clark was a high school teacher and coach and also coached for the New Jersey Intensity travel ball organization.

== Head coaching record ==
=== College ===
Record table
| Season | Team | Overall | Conference | Standing | Postseason |
|---|---|---|---|---|---|
Florida Atlantic Owls (Conference USA) (2023)
| 2023 | Florida Atlantic | 35–20 | 15–9 | 4th | |
Florida Atlantic Owls (American Athletic Conference) (2024–Present)
| 2024 | Florida Atlantic | 41–16 | 21–6 | T-1st | NCAA Regional |
| 2025 | Florida Atlantic | 45–11 | 23–4 | 1st | NCAA Regional |
| Florida Atlantic: | | 121–47 (.720) | 59–19 (.756) | | |
| Total: | | 121–47 (.720) | | | |
National champion Postseason invitational champion Conference regular season champion Conference regular season and conference tournament champion Division regular season champion Division regular season and conference tournament champion Conference tournament champion
