= Joshua Walker =

Joshua Walker may refer to:

- Joshua Walker (MP) (1786–1862), Member of Parliament for Aldeburgh in Suffolk
- Joshua "J.D." Walker (born 1983), songwriter and record producer

== See also ==
- Josh Walker (disambiguation)
