= Melinda Fischer =

American softball and basketball coach

Melinda Fischer (born 1950 or 1951) is a retired softball and basketball coach who was active from the 1970s to 2020s. As an AIAW coach, Fischer coached the women's basketball and softball teams at Eastern Illinois University during the 1970s. With Illinois State University, her team reached the second round of the 1981 AIAW National Division I Basketball Championship and the third place game of the 1982 National Women's Invitational Tournament. The following year, her team won the Gateway Collegiate Athletic Conference tournament and reached the first round of the NCAA Division I women's basketball tournament. In 1985, Fischer's team competed in the first round of the NCAA Division I tournament and she received the Coach of the Year for the Gateway Conference.

After becoming Illinois State's softball coach in 1985, Fischer's team won the Gateway Conference Tournament and reached the final of the Midwest Regional at the NCAA Division I softball tournament in 1988. Between 1995 and 2012, Fischer received five Coach of the Year awards and won the Missouri Valley Conference Tournament four times. Her team also competed in the 2017 National Invitational Softball Championship. After accumulating over 1110 wins with Illinois State before leaving the team in 2022, Fischer had the most wins by a Missouri Valley Conference softball coach. That year, she was in the top 25 for most wins by an NCAA softball coach with her combined wins with the two universities. Fischer became part of the National Fastpitch Coaches Association Hall of Fame in 2010.

== Early life and education ==
Fischer was born in the early 1950s and grew up in Pekin, Illinois. During her childhood, she played catch by herself with a tennis ball and baseball glove. During her teens, she played with a softball. In team sports, she was on a softball team as part of the Pekin Lassie League. Fischer also played basketball as an AAU athlete.

While attending Illinois State University, Fischer was on the softball team that finished second at the 1969 Women's College World Series. In basketball, her team competed in the 1972 AIAW National Basketball Championship. At Illinois State, she was also on their field hockey team.

== Career ==
=== 1970s ===
During the early 1970s, Fischer went to Joliet and was a middle school teacher. In the mid-1970s, Fischer worked for the women's basketball and softball teams at Illinois State in graduate assistant positions. During 1975, Fischer was a high school teacher and multi-sport coach in Peoria. The following year, Fischer began working at Eastern Illinois University. While coaching their women's basketball team from 1976 to 1979, Fischer had 37 wins and 30 losses in the AIAW. With Eastern Illinois's softball team, Fischer had 41 wins and 25 losses as their coach from 1978 to 1979. In August 1979, Fischer started assistant coaching positions for the basketball and softball teams at Illinois State.

=== Illinois State basketball ===
As co-head coach of the basketball team with Jill Hutchison from 1980 to 1985, Fischer had 113 wins and 47 losses with Illinois State. During this time period, her team competed at the 1981 AIAW National Division I Basketball Championship and reached the second round. At the National Women's Invitational Tournament, Fischer and Illinois State made it to the third place game in 1982. In 1983, her team won the Gateway Collegiate Athletic Conference women's basketball tournament. As an NCAA Division I women's basketball tournament competitor, Illinois State reached the first round that year with Fischer. They also entered the 1985 NCAA event and competed in the first round.

=== Illinois State softball ===
In August 1985, Fischer became the coach for Illinois State's softball team. Fischer's softball team were the 1988 Gateway Conference Tournament winners. That year, Illinois State and Fischer reached the final of the Midwest Regional during the 1988 NCAA Division I softball tournament. In 1992, the Missouri Valley Conference and Gateway Conference were combined. At the Missouri Valley Conference Tournament, Fischer's softball team won the event in 1995 and 2000. Further Missouri Valley Conference Tournament wins for softball by Fischer's team occurred in 2001 and 2012. Apart from the Missouri Valley Conference, Illinois State competed in the 2017 National Invitational Softball Championship with Fischer.

In 2007, Fischer broke Duffy Bass's record for most wins by an Illinois State coach. She won her 1000th game in 2015 and her 1100th game in 2020. Fischer ended her softball career in 2022 after accumulating 1118 wins, 842 losses and 4 ties with Illinois State. In 2022, Fischer had the most wins by a Missouri Valley Conference softball coach. That year, Fischer's combined total of wins with Eastern Illinois and Illinois State placed her in the top 25 for most wins by an NCAA softball coach.

=== Additional positions ===
In 1993, Fischer joined the National Fastpitch Coaches Association as a volunteer. That year, she became their First Vice-president and held the position for five years. In 2004, Fischer was part of a planned group to help Illinois State hire an athletic director. She joined the NFCA DI All-American Committee for 2018 to 2021.

== Awards and honors ==
As part of the Gateway Conference, Fischer was one of the Coach of the Year winners for women's basketball in 1985. In softball, Fischer received the Coach of the Year award for the Gateway Conference in 1987. With the Missouri Valley Conference, Fischer was the Coach of the Year four times from 1995 to 2001 and a co-winner of the 2006 Coaching Staff of the Year for softball. In 2007, Fischer was named part of the Softball All-Centennial Team for the MVC.

Fischer joined the Illinois State Athletics Percy Family Hall of Fame in 1987 as a member of their softball team from 1969. As an individual, she joined this hall of fame in 1993. In 2010, funding was given to start creating the Melinda Fischer Softball Field at Illinois State. For the university, Fischer joined their College of Applied Science and Technology Hall of Fame in 2016.

In 2002, Fischer won the Distinguished Service Award from the National Fastpitch Coaches Association. The award became the Melinda Fischer Distinguished Service Award in 2018. Fischer joined the National Fastpitch Coaches Association Hall of Fame in 2010.
