= Bob Coolen =

American softball coach

Biographical details
- Born: January 24, 1958 (age 68); Somerville, Massachusetts

Playing career
- 1976–1980: Wesleyan
- Positions: Pitcher, Wide receiver

Coaching career (HC unless noted)
- 1985–1989: Bentley
- 1990–1991: Hawaii (asst.)
- 1992–present: Hawaii

Head coaching record
- Overall: 1,205–828–1 (.593)
- Tournaments: 25–24 (.510) (NCAA)

Accomplishments and honors

Championships
- 2× Big West regular season (1994, 2013); Big West Tournament (2013); 4× WAC regular season (2003, 2007, 2010, 2012); WAC Tournament (2010)

Awards
- 2× Big West coach of the year (1994, 2013); 4× WAC coach of the year (2003, 2007, 2010, 2012)

Robert Coolen (born January 24, 1958) is an American softball coach who was most recently the head coach of the University of Hawaii's softball program.

== Personal life and education ==
A native of Somerville, Massachusetts, Coolen was a multi-sport athlete at Wesleyan University, where he played wide receiver on the school's football team, a pitcher on the baseball team, and a member of the swim team. He turned down an appointment from the United States Naval Academy to play at Wesleyan. He graduated from Wesleyan in 1980 with a degree in government and earned a master's degree in human movement from Boston University in 1986. Coolen and his wife Nanci have two children, Demi and Bo. Bo was the associate head coach for the baseball team at Westcliff University. He has since moved to Grace College as co-head coach of the softball team with his wife Sam.

== Coaching career ==
Coolen started his coaching career at Bentley University in Waltham, Massachusetts, working as the head coach of the university's softball team and swimming team. In addition to his duties as the head coach of the two teams, Coolen also served as the equipment and facilities manager. Coolen left Bentley to join Rayla Allison's coaching staff at Hawaii in 1990 as an assistant.

=== Hawaii ===
After Allison resigned to become the first full-time executive director of the National Fastpitch Coaches Association, Coolen was named the head coach of the Wahine softball team in 1992.

Coolen and his staff led a 2010 Wahine squad that shattered the record for most home runs by a team in a single season, en route to a WAC championship and a berth in the NCAA tournament. Following a win in the Tuscaloosa regional over #1 seed Alabama, Hawaii advanced to the Women's College World Series, the Wahine's first and only Women's College World Series appearance to date.

Coolen earned his 1000th win on April 13, 2019, with a 5–2 win over UC Santa Barbara, joining Dave Shoji, Les Murakami, and Jim Schwitters as the only coaches to win 1,000 games in the history of the university's athletic department.

Coolen signed a two-year contract extension in 2023 to remain the head coach at Hawaii through the 2025 season, which is scheduled to be his final season before retirement. Coolen officially retired after the 2025 season.

== Head coaching record ==
Statistics overview
Season	Team	Overall	Conference	Standing	Postseason
Hawai'i Rainbow Wahine (Big West Conference) (1992–1996)
1992	Hawai'i	34–33	13–23	7th	
1993	Hawai'i	24–35	9–23	8th	
1994	Hawai'i	51–14	25–7	1st	NCAA Regional
1995	Hawai'i	47–21	21–11	3rd	NCAA Regional
1996	Hawai'i	36–25	15–17	6th	
Hawai'i Rainbow Wahine (Western Athletic Conference) (1997–2012)
1997	Hawai'i	37–25–1	18–14	4th	
1998	Hawai'i	46–15	22–8	2nd	NCAA Regional
1999	Hawai'i	35–23	16–8	3rd	NCAA Regional
2000	Hawai'i	25–24	11–9	2nd	
2001	Hawai'i	46–18	16–4	2nd	NCAA Regional
2002	Hawai'i	35–25	15–9	3rd	
2003	Hawai'i	40–20	17–3	1st	NCAA Regional
2004	Hawai'i	28–33	10–14	5th	
2005	Hawai'i	31–21	12–6	2nd	
2006	Hawai'i	32–22	10–7	3rd	
2007	Hawai'i	50–13	16–2	1st	NCAA Super Regional
2008	Hawai'i	40–21	10–7	3rd	NCAA Regional
2009	Hawai'i	30–24	15–6	3rd	
2010	Hawai'i	50–16	19–1	1st	Women's College World Series
2011	Hawai'i	37–18	14–7	4th	
2012	Hawai'i	44–9	17–3	1st	NCAA Regional
Hawai'i Rainbow Wahine (Big West Conference) (2013–present)
2013	Hawai'i	45–13	20–4	1st	NCAA Regional
2014	Hawai'i	22–28	7–14	7th	
2015	Hawai'i	32–22	13–8	3rd	
2016	Hawai'i	24–30	8–13	7th	
2017	Hawai'i	26–23	8–13	7th	
2018	Hawai'i	23–27	7–14	T–7th	
2019	Hawai'i	33–16	14–7	2nd	
2020	Hawai'i	9–15 (Note: Season not played past March 11 due to COVID-19 pandemic)	0–0	–	
2021	Hawai'i	12–19	11–13	6th	
2022	Hawai'i	23–19	17–10	3rd	
2023	Hawai'i	30–23	13–14	T–5th	
2024	Hawai'i	20–26	13–12	4th	
2025	Hawai'i	33–20	17–10	T–2nd	
Hawaii:		1,133–736–1 (.606)	469–321 (.594)		
Total:		1,205–828–1 (.593)			
National champion Postseason invitational champion Conference regular season champion Conference regular season and conference tournament champion Division regular season champion Division regular season and conference tournament champion Conference tournament champion

== See also ==
- List of college softball coaches with 1,000 wins
