= 1991 NCAA Division I softball tournament =

- Teams: 20
- Finals site: ASA Hall of Fame Stadium; Oklahoma City, Oklahoma
- Champions: Arizona (1st title)
- Runner-up: UCLA (9th WCWS Appearance)
- Winning coach: Mike Candrea (1st title)

The 1991 NCAA Division I softball tournament was the tenth annual tournament to determine the national champion of NCAA women's collegiate softball. Held during May 1991, twenty Division I college softball teams contested the championship. The tournament featured eight regionals of either two or three teams, each in a double elimination format. The 1991 Women's College World Series was held in Oklahoma City, Oklahoma from May 23 through May 26 and marked the conclusion of the 1991 NCAA Division I softball season. Arizona won their first championship by defeating three-time defending champions UCLA 5–1 in the final game.

== Regionals ==
=== Regional No. 1 ===
==== First elimination round ====
- Florida State 1, Southwestern Louisiana 0
- Oklahoma State 3, Southwestern Louisiana 2
- Florida State 2, Oklahoma State 0

==== Second elimination round ====
Team		G1	G2
–	Florida State	4	—
–	Oklahoma State	3	—

- Florida State qualifies for WCWS, 3–0

=== Regional No. 2 ===
Team		G1	G2	G3
–	UCLA	4	5	—
–	Central Michigan	0	0	—

- UCLA qualifies for WCWS, 2–0

=== Regional No. 3 ===
==== First elimination round ====
- UMass 3, Connecticut 1
- UNLV 3, Connecticut 0
- UNLV 4, UMass 0

==== Second elimination round ====
Team		G1	G2
–	UNLV	5	—
–	UMass	0	—

- UNLV qualifies for WCWS, 3–0

=== Regional No. 4 ===
Team		G1	G2	G3
–	Arizona	4	4	—
–	Arizona State	2	0	—

- Arizona qualifies for WCWS, 2–0

=== Regional No. 5 ===
Team		G1	G2	G3
–	Cal State Fullerton	3^{10}	1	1
–	Long Beach State	2	2	5

- Long Beach State qualifies for WCWS, 2–1

=== Regional No. 6 ===
==== First elimination round ====
- Missouri 2, Southern Illinois 0
- Iowa 2, Southern Illinois 0
- Missouri 2, Iowa 0

==== Second elimination round ====
Team		G1	G2
–	Missouri	4	—
–	Iowa	0	—

- Missouri qualifies for WCWS, 3–0

=== Regional No. 7 ===
Team		G1	G2	G3
–	Fresno State	2	8	—
–	California	0	1	—

- Fresno State qualifies for WCWS, 2–0

=== Regional No. 8 ===
==== First elimination round ====
- Utah 1, Minnesota 0
- Minnesota 3, Texas A&M 0
- Texas A&M 1, Utah 0
- Utah 2, Minnesota 0

==== Second elimination round ====
Team		G1	G2
–	Utah	3	—
–	Texas A&M	0	—

- Utah qualifies for WCWS, 3–1

== Women's College World Series ==
=== Participants ===
- Arizona
- Florida State
- Fresno State
- Long Beach State
- Missouri
- UCLA
- UNLV
- Utah

=== Game results ===
==== Bracket ====
Upper round 1
Florida State	0
UCLA	1
UNLV	0
Arizona	1^{13}
Long Beach State	1
Missouri	0
Fresno State	2
Utah	0

Upper round 2
UCLA	0
Arizona	1^{9}
Long Beach State	3
Fresno State	0
Lower round 1
Florida State	3
UNLV	1
Missouri	2^{9}
Utah	0

Upper final
Arizona	1^{8}
Long Beach State	0
Lower round 2
Fresno State	3
Florida State	0
Missouri	0
UCLA	5

Semifinals
Arizona	0
Fresno State	1^{8}
Long Beach State	0
UCLA	1^{11}

Preliminary final
Fresno State	1
UCLA	5^{13}

Final
Arizona	5
UCLA	1

=== Championship Game ===
School	Top Batter	Stats.
Arizona Wildcats	Julie Jones (1B)	3-4 2RBI 3B K
UCLA Bruins	Lisa Fernandez (P)	2-2 RBI HR BB

School	Pitcher	IP	H	R	ER	BB	SO	AB
Arizona Wildcats	Debby Day (W)	7.0	4	1	1	2	1	24
UCLA Bruins	Heather Compton (L)	3.2	4	4	3	3	2	14
UCLA Bruins	Lisa Fernandez	3.1	3	1	1	2	5	13

=== All-Tournament Team ===
The following players were named to the All-Tournament Team

Pos	Name	School
P	Heather Compton	UCLA
P	Debbie Day	Arizona
C	Kerry Dienelt	UCLA
1B	Julie Jones	Arizona
2B	Julie Smith	Fresno State
3B	Lisa Fernandez	UCLA
SS	Julie Standering	Arizona
OF	Kristin Gauthier	Arizona
OF	Yvonne Gutierrez	UCLA
OF	Lorraine Maynez	UCLA
AL	Kim Maher	Fresno State
AL	Terry Carpenter	Fresno State

== See also ==
- 1991 NCAA Division II softball tournament
- 1991 NCAA Division III softball tournament
- 1991 NAIA softball tournament
- 1991 NCAA Division I baseball tournament
