= NCAA Division III softball tournament =

Annual tournament in the United States

- Association: NCAA
- Sport: College softball
- Founded: 1982; 44 years ago
- Division: Division III
- No. of teams: 231 (in the country)
- Country: United States
- Most recent champion: Redlands (1st)
- Most titles: TCNJ (6)
- Broadcaster: ESPNU
- Website: NCAA.com

The NCAA Division III softball tournament is the annual tournament hosted by the National Collegiate Athletic Association to determine the champion of women's college softball among its Division III programs in the United States. The final portion of the tournament is also called the Division III Women's College World Series. It has been held every year since 1982, except 2020.

The most successful team to date has been TCNJ, with six national titles.

Redlands are the reigning national champions, winning their first title in 2026.

== History ==
Softball was one of twelve women's sports that got added to the NCAA championship program for the 1981–82 school year, as the NCAA engaged in battle with the AIAW for sole governance of women's collegiate sports. The AIAW continued to conduct their own established championship program in the same twelve (and other) sports; however, after a year of dual women's championships, the NCAA overtook the AIAW and usurped its authority and membership.

== Results ==
NCAA Division III Softball Championship
Year	Site	Championship results		
Year	Site	Winner	Score	Runner-up
1982; Details	Ewing, NJ	Eastern Connecticut State	2–0	Trenton State
1983; Details	Willimantic, CT	Trenton State	7–0	Buena Vista
1984; Details	De Pere, WI	Buena Vista	3–1	Trenton State
1985; Details	Willimantic, CT	Eastern Connecticut State (2)	1–0	Trenton State
1986; Details	Storm Lake, IA	Eastern Connecticut State (3)	1–0	Central (IA)
1987; Details	Willimantic, CT	Trenton State (2)	3–0	Wisconsin–Whitewater
1988; Details	Elmhurst, IL	Central (IA)	3–2	Allegheny
1989; Details	Ewing, NJ	Trenton State (3)	8–7 (9 inn.)	Eastern Connecticut State
1990; Details	Storm Lake, IA	Eastern Connecticut State (4)	1–0	Trenton State
1991; Details	Willimantic, CT	Central (IA) (2)	4–0	Eastern Connecticut State
1992; Details	Pella, IA	Trenton State (4)	4–0	Buena Vista
1993; Details	Decatur, IL	Central (IA) (3)	7–3	Trenton State
1994; Details	Salem, VA	Trenton State (5)	6–5	Bridgewater State
1995; Details	Storm Lake, IA	Chapman	4–2	Trenton State
1996; Details	Salem, VA	Trenton State (6)	7–2	Chapman
1997; Details	Eau Claire, WI	Simpson	2–1 (9 inn.)	Montclair State
1998; Details	Salem, VA	Wisconsin–Stevens Point	3–1	Chapman
1999; Details	Eau Claire, WI	Simpson (2)	6–0	Chapman
2000; Details	Salem, VA	Saint Mary's (MN)	5–0	Chapman
2001; Details	Eau Claire, WI	Muskingum	5–1	Central (IA)
2002; Details	Eau Claire, WI	Ithaca	1–0	Lake Forest
2003; Details	Salem, VA	Central (IA) (4)	5–3	Salisbury
2004; Details	Salem, VA	St. Thomas (MN)	2–0	Moravian
2005; Details	Raleigh, NC	St. Thomas (MN) (2)	9–3	Salisbury
2006; Details	Raleigh, NC	Rutgers–Camden	3–2	St. Thomas (MN)
2007; Details	Salem, VA	Linfield	10–2 (6 inn.)	Washington–St. Louis
2008; Details	Salem, VA	Wisconsin–Eau Claire	4–3 (9 inn.)	Wisconsin–Whitewater
2009; Details	Montclair, NJ	Messiah	2–0	Coe
2010; Details	Eau Claire, WI	East Texas Baptist	5–4	Linfield
2011; Details	Salem, VA	Linfield (2)	6–2	Christopher Newport
2012; Details	Salem, VA	Pacific Lutheran	3–0	Linfield
2013; Details	Eau Claire, WI	Tufts	6–5	SUNY Cortland
2014; Details	Tyler, TX	Tufts (2)	6–0	Salisbury
2015; Details	Salem, VA	Tufts (3)	7–4	Texas–Tyler
2016; Details	Salem, VA	Texas–Tyler	7–0	Messiah
2017; Details	Oklahoma City, OK	Virginia Wesleyan	1–0	St. John Fisher
2018; Details	Oklahoma City, OK	Virginia Wesleyan (2)	3–1	Illinois Wesleyan
2019; Details	Tyler, TX	Texas Lutheran	6–1	Emory
2020; Details	Cancelled due to the coronavirus pandemic			
2021; Details	Salem, VA	Virginia Wesleyan (3)	9–1 (5 inn.)	Texas Lutheran
2022; Details	Salem, VA	Christopher Newport	3–0	Trine
2023; Details	Marshall, TX	Trine	2–1	Salisbury
2024; Details	Marshall, TX	East Texas Baptist (2)	9–5	Belhaven
2025; Details	Bloomington, IL	Trine (2)	2–0	Virginia Wesleyan
2026; Details	Salem, VA	Redlands	2–0	Trine
2027	Decatur, IL			
2028	Marshall, TX			

== Champions ==
=== Active programs ===
Team	Titles	Years
TCNJ	6	1983, 1987, 1989, 1992, 1994, 1996
Eastern Connecticut	4	1982, 1985, 1986, 1990
Central (IA)	4	1988, 1991, 1993, 2003
Tufts	3	2013, 2014, 2015
Virginia Wesleyan	3	2017, 2018, 2021
Trine	2	2023, 2025
East Texas Baptist	2	2010, 2024
Linfield	2	2007, 2011
Simpson	2	1997, 1999
Redlands	1	2026
Christopher Newport	1	2022
Texas Lutheran	1	2019
Pacific Lutheran	1	2012
Messiah	1	2009
Wisconsin–Eau Claire	1	2008
Rutgers–Camden	1	2006
Ithaca	1	2002
Muskingum	1	2001
Saint Mary's (MN)	1	2000
Wisconsin–Stevens Point	1	1998
Chapman	1	1995
Buena Vista	1	1984

=== Former programs ===
Team	Titles	Years
St. Thomas (MN)	2	2004, 2005
UT Tyler	1	2016

== See also ==
- College softball
- NCAA Division I softball tournament
- NCAA Division II softball tournament
- AIAW Intercollegiate Women's Softball Champions
- NAIA Softball Championship
