= Hawaii Rainbow Wahine softball =

- Founded: 1985; 41 years ago
- University: University of Hawaii at Manoa
- Athletic director: Matt Elliott
- Head coach: Panita Thanatharn (1st season)
- Conference: Mountain West
- Location: Honolulu, Hawaii, US
- Home stadium: Rainbow Wahine Softball Stadium (capacity: 1,200)
- Nickname: Rainbow Wahine
- Colors: Green, black, silver, and white

NCAA WCWS appearances
- 2010

NCAA super regional appearances
- 2007, 2010

NCAA Tournament appearances
- 1995, 1998, 1999, 2001, 2003, 2007, 2008, 2010, 2012, 2013

Conference tournament championships
- 2010, 2013

Regular-season conference championships
- 1994, 2003, 2007, 2010, 2012, 2013

The Hawaiʻi Rainbow Wāhine softball team represents the University of Hawaiʻi at Mānoa in NCAA Division I college softball. The team participates in the Mountain West Conference (MW). The Rainbow Wahine are currently led by head coach Panita Thanatharn. The team plays its home games at Rainbow Wahine Softball Stadium located on the university's campus.

== Coaching history ==
Years	Coach	Record	%
1985–1989	Alika Thompson	94–130	.420
1990–1991	Rayla Allison	57–65	.467
1992–2025	Bob Coolen	1,133–736–1	.606
2025–present	Panita Thanatharn	33–20	.623

== Home stadium ==
Rainbow Wahine Softball Stadium is located on the university's campus, and is currently the home venue for the softball program. The stadium was named the Wahine Softball Field when it first opened in 1985, but was renamed in 1998 when renovations expanding the seating capacity to 1,200 were completed. The stadium also underwent renovations between the 2017 and 2018 seasons, when artificial turf and additional netting were installed, as well as the entire stadium being pinted. As of 2021, the stadium is undergoing additional renovations: a new clubhouse holding coaches' offices and a locker room for players is expected to be completed by Summer 2021.

== See also ==
- List of NCAA Division I softball programs
