= Joan Joyce =

American softball coach (1940–2022)

Biographical details
- Born: August 18, 1940; Waterbury, Connecticut, U.S.
- Died: March 26, 2022 (aged 81); Boca Raton, Florida, U.S.

Playing career

Softball
- 1954–1963: Raybestos Brakettes
- 1964–1966: Orange Lionettes
- 1967–1975: Raybestos Brakettes

Golf
- 1977–1995: LPGA

Basketball
- 1964–1965: USA Women's National Team

Coaching career (HC unless noted)

College softball
- 1973–1974: LIU Brooklyn
- 1974–1975: Mattatuck Community College
- 1995–2022: Florida Atlantic

College golf
- 1996–2014: Florida Atlantic

Head coaching record
- Overall: 1002–674–1 (.598)

Joan Joyce (August 18, 1940 – March 26, 2022) was the softball coach at Florida Atlantic, for 28 years until her death in 2022. She previously was a softball player for the Raybestos Brakettes and the Orange Lionettes. She also had set records on the LPGA Tour as a golfer and on the USA women's national basketball team, and was a player and coach for the Connecticut Clippers volleyball team.

== Softball ==
=== Playing career ===
Joyce played for the Brakettes from 1954 to 1963, the Lionettes from 1964 to 1966, and again the Brakettes from 1967 to 1975, In her career, she racked up many of the sport's records, which have yet to be broken:

- Most consecutive all-star team selections (18)
- Eight-time MVP in the National Tournament (1961, 1963, 1968, 1971 (co-MVP), 1973, 1974, and 1975)
- Most victories in a season (42) (in 1974)
- Two no-hit, no-run games in National Tournament (four times)
- Shutouts in a season (38 in 1974)
- Most innings pitched in a game (29 in 1968 against Perkasie)
- Career doubles (153)
- Doubles in a season (22 in 1968)
- Career triples (67)
- Brakettes team batting champion (1960, 1962, 1967–69, 1973)
- Highest batting average (.467 in 1971)

Her pitches were extremely fast at over 70 miles per hour. She pitched 150 no-hitters and 50 perfect games, with a lifetime earned run average of 0.09. In her record-setting 42-win season, she pitched 38 shutouts. Her 1974 Brakettes team was the first American team to win the world championship.

In exhibition games, she struck out Ted Williams at Municipal Stadium in Waterbury, Connecticut in 1961 (also during a brief stint in 1966) and Hank Aaron in 1978.

=== Coaching career ===
Joyce was co-founder (with Billie Jean King, Jim Jorgensen and Dennis Murphy) of the Women's Professional Softball League in 1976 and the coach and part owner of the Connecticut Falcons team, which won the Championship all four years of the league's history.

She was a coach at Florida Atlantic University, having coached softball since 1994 and women's golf since 1996. As of 2022, Joyce's Owls team won eleven conference championships and advanced to eleven NCAA Division I softball tournaments. In her first two seasons (1995 and 1996), the Owls were Atlantic Sun Conference runners-up, then won the next eight championships. They took second in 2005, then won again in 2006. The Owls won the Sun Belt Conference championship in 2007, and the Conference USA championship in 2016. Joyce was named Atlantic Sun Conference Coach of the Year in 1995, 1997, 1999, 2000, and 2002, Sun Belt Conference Coach of the Year in 2007, and Conference USA Coach of the Year in 2016 and 2018.

On March 18, 2022, Joyce earned her 1,000th career win as a head coach, becoming the 27th NCAA Division I softball coach to reach the milestone.

== Golf ==
After softball, she joined the LPGA Tour, in which she was from 1977 to 1994. Her best finishes included sixth-place in tournaments in 1981, 1982 and 1984, including a round of 66. Joyce holds the record for lowest number of putts (17) in a single LPGA round, set at the 1982 Lady Michelob.

== Volleyball ==
Joyce served as player and coach in the United States Volleyball Association with the Connecticut Clippers. She competed in four national tournaments, and was named to the All-East Regional team.

== Basketball ==
Joyce played on the USA women's national basketball team in 1964 and 1965, setting a national tournament single game scoring record in 1964 with 67 points. She was a four-time Women's Basketball Association All-American, and a three-time Amateur Athletic Union (AAU) All-America player.

== Halls of Fame ==
Joyce was inducted into the National Softball Hall of Fame in 1983. She was inducted into the International Softball Federation Hall of Fame in 1999.

In addition to the National Softball Hall of Fame and International Softball Federation Hall of Fame, she has been inducted into the Palm Beach County Sports Hall of Fame, Connecticut Women's Hall of Fame, the Connecticut Women's Basketball Hall of Fame, the Hank O'Donnell Hall of Fame, the Fairfield County Sports Hall of Fame, the Greater Waterbury Hall of Fame, and, as one of only three Americans, the International Women's Sports Hall of Fame.

== Death ==
Joyce died on March 26, 2022 in Boca Raton, Florida.

== Head coaching record ==
=== College softball ===
Record table
Season	Team	Overall	Conference	Standing	Postseason
Florida Atlantic Owls (Atlantic Sun Conference) (1995–2006)
1995	Florida Atlantic	33–18	9–5	2nd (East)	
1996	Florida Atlantic	37–32	11–5	3rd (East)	
1997	Florida Atlantic	42–29	14–2	1st (East)	
1998	Florida Atlantic	47–20	14–6	1st (East)	
1999	Florida Atlantic	49–20	10–2	1st (East)	NCAA Regional
2000	Florida Atlantic	57–17	13–1	1st	NCAA Regional
2001	Florida Atlantic	46–21	9–5	T–1st	NCAA Regional
2002	Florida Atlantic	62–13	16–2	1st	NCAA Regional
2003	Florida Atlantic	44–28	18–4	1st	NCAA Regional
2004	Florida Atlantic	56–18	17–3	1st	NCAA Regional
2005	Florida Atlantic	37–32	14–6	2nd	
2006	Florida Atlantic	35–25	15–5	T–2nd	NCAA Regional
Florida Atlantic Owls (Sun Belt Conference) (2007–2013)
2007	Florida Atlantic	42–23	16–8	1st	
2008	Florida Atlantic	35–26	17–7	2nd	
2009	Florida Atlantic	30–30	10–13	7th	
2010	Florida Atlantic	28–26	12–10	4th	
2011	Florida Atlantic	34–25	15–9	2nd	
2012	Florida Atlantic	15–39	5–18	T–8th	
2013	Florida Atlantic	28–29	10–12	5th	
Florida Atlantic Owls (Conference USA) (2014–Present)
2014	Florida Atlantic	33–22	15–9	T–3rd	
2015	Florida Atlantic	39–19–1	16–7	2nd (East)	NCAA Regional
2016	Florida Atlantic	51–9	22–2	1st (East)	NCAA Regional
2017	Florida Atlantic	35–21	15–9	3rd (East)	
2018	Florida Atlantic	30–26	15–8	1st (East)	
2019	Florida Atlantic	20–30	7–17	5th (East)	
2020	Florida Atlantic	8–14	1–2	3rd (East)	Season canceled due to COVID-19 pandemic
2021	Florida Atlantic	12–35	6–14	6th (East)	
2022	Florida Atlantic	18–17	6–3	2nd (East)	
Florida Atlantic:		1002–674–1 (.598)	348–194 (.642)		
Total:		1002–674–1 (.598)			
National champion Postseason invitational champion Conference regular season champion Conference regular season and conference tournament champion Division regular season champion Division regular season and conference tournament champion Conference tournament champion
