= Matt Elliott (sports executive) =

American college athletic director

Current position
- Title: Athletic director
- Team: Hawaii
- Conference: Mountain West
- Annual salary: $425,000

Biographical details
- Born: 1976 or 1977 (age 49–50)
- Education: Amherst College; Pritzker School of Law

Administrative career (AD unless noted)
- 2012–2022: UCLA (Associate AD)
- 2022–2024: UCLA (Chief Strategy Officer)
- 2025–present: Hawaii

Matthew Marshall Elliott (born 1976 or 1977) is an American college athletics administrator who is the athletic director at the University of Hawaiʻi at Mānoa. A graduate of Amherst College, Elliott was a member of the varsity rowing team before attending Northwestern University for law school.

== Career ==
On June 5, 2025, Elliott was named as the athletic director of the Hawaii Rainbow Warriors and Rainbow Wahine.
