= Sandy Jerstad =

American politician and softball coach

Member of the South Dakota Senate from the 12th district
- In office 2006–2011

Personal details
- Born: November 18, 1943 (age 82) St. Paul, Minnesota, U.S.
- Party: Democratic
- Spouse: Widowed
- Education: St. Olaf College, South Dakota State University, University of South Dakota
- Profession: Educator

Sandra Isabelle "Sandy" Jerstad is a Democratic member of the South Dakota Senate, who represented the 12th district, being elected in 2006. Senator Jerstad sought reelection in 2010 but was defeated in the general election by Republican Mark Johnston.

Jerstad was a softball coach at Augustana College from 1977 to 2003, winning one NCAA Division II national championship in 1991. With 1,011 wins, she is in the National Fastpitch Coaches Association Hall of Fame.
