= North Carolina Tar Heels softball =

American college softball team

- University: University of North Carolina at Chapel Hill
- Head coach: Megan Smith (3rd season)
- Conference: ACC
- Location: Chapel Hill, North Carolina, US
- Home stadium: Williams Field at Anderson Stadium (capacity: 500)
- Nickname: Tar Heels
- Colors: Carolina blue and white

NCAA Tournament appearances
- 2001, 2003, 2004, 2005, 2006, 2007, 2008, 2009, 2010, 2012, 2013, 2015, 2016, 2017, 2019, 2025

Conference tournament championships
- 2001

Regular-season conference championships
- 1996, 1998, 2000, 2008, 2012

The North Carolina Tar Heels softball team is the team that represents the University of North Carolina at Chapel Hill in NCAA Division I college softball. They currently participate in the Atlantic Coast Conference.

== Home venues ==
Since 2002, the team has played at the UNC Softball Complex. The complex is fully floodlit and includes a separate practice field, a press box, and concessions. Coaches' offices are also on site in the adjoining building housing the locker rooms. Williams Field and Anderson Stadium, capacity 500, were officially dedicated following a game against Georgia Tech on April 23, 2006. Previously, they had played at Finley Field and Williams Field.

== Individual honors ==
| | Name | Year(s) |
|---|---|---|
| First Team All-America Selection | Christine Kubin | 1996 |
| First Team All-America Selection | Brandy Arthur | 1998 |
| First Team All-America Selection | Danielle Spaulding | 2010 |
| ACC Player of the Year | Beverly Smith | 1994 |
| ACC Player of the Year | Brandy Arthur | 1998 |
| ACC Player of the Year | Michelle Semmes | 2000 |
| ACC Player of the Year | Danielle Spaulding | 2008; 2009 |
| ACC Pitcher of the Year | Danielle Spaulding | 2010 |
| ACC Pitcher of the Year | Lori Spingola | 2012 |
| ACC Rookie of the Year | Radara McHugh | 1998 |
| ACC Rookie of the Year | Crystal Cox | 2003 |
| ACC Coach of the Year | Donna J. Papa | 1996; 1998; 2000; 2008; 2012 |
| NFCA Hall of Fame Inductee | Donna J. Papa | 2012 |

Natalie Anter represented Italy at the 2004 Summer Olympics in Athens, Greece.

== All-time record ==
The softball team was officially established in 1977, switching to fast pitch play in 1984. Conference play officially began in 1992, with a first qualification for the NCAA Tournament in 2001.

| Year | Head coach | Overall | ACC | ACC Tournament | NCAA Tournament | Coaches Poll |
|---|---|---|---|---|---|---|
| 1977 | Dolly Hunter | 13–18 | — | — | — | — |
| 1978 | Dolly Hunter | 21–13 | — | — | — | — |
| 1979 | Beth Miller | 18–11 | — | — | — | — |
| 1980 | Susan Clark | 25–16 | — | — | — | — |
| 1981 | Susan Clark | 47–22 | — | — | — | — |
| 1982 | Susan Clark | 34–28–1 | — | — | — | — |
| 1983 | Susan Clark | 19–19 | — | — | — | — |
| 1984 | Susan Clark | 26–14 | — | — | — | — |
| 1985 | Susan Clark | 28–14 | — | — | — | — |
| 1986 | Donna J. Papa | 35–13 | — | — | — | — |
| 1987 | Donna J. Papa | 36–11–1 | — | — | — | — |
| 1988 | Donna J. Papa | 25–23 | — | — | — | — |
| 1989 | Donna J. Papa | 35–17 | — | — | — | — |
| 1990 | Donna J. Papa | 38–18 | — | — | — | — |
| 1991 | Donna J. Papa | 36–12 | — | — | — | — |
| 1992 | Donna J. Papa | 45–18 | 3–4 | 1–2 | — | — |
| 1993 | Donna J. Papa | 42–17 | 3–1 | 0–2 | — | — |
| 1994 | Donna J. Papa | 32–25 | 2–4 | 1–2 | — | — |
| 1995 | Donna J. Papa | 25–34 | 1–5 | 1–2 | — | — |
| 1996 | Donna J. Papa | 33–29–1 | 6–1 | 2–2 | — | — |
| 1997 | Donna J. Papa | 21–34 | 2–6 | 1–2 | — | — |
| 1998 | Donna J. Papa | 32–21 | 6–2 | 1–2 | — | — |
| 1999 | Donna J. Papa | 39–22 | 4–4 | 0–2 | — | — |
| 2000 | Donna J. Papa | 47–17 | 6–2 | 0–2 | — | — |
| 2001 | Donna J. Papa | 38–19–1 | 6–2 | 3–0 | 1–2 | — |
| 2002 | Donna J. Papa | 34–30 | 2–6 | 3–2 | — | — |
| 2003 | Donna J. Papa | 40–22–1 | 4–3 | 0–2 | 1–2 | — |
| 2004 | Donna J. Papa | 44–22 | 6–4 | 1–2 | 1–2 | — |
| 2005 | Donna J. Papa | 38–29 | 9–9 | 0–2 | 2–2 | — |
| 2006 | Donna J. Papa | 48–19 | 13–7 | 2–2 | 0–2 | — |
| 2007 | Donna J. Papa | 46–21 | 11–9 | 2–2 | 1–2 | — |
| 2008 | Donna J. Papa | 50–12–1 | 18–2 | 1–1 | 0–2 | 20 |
| 2009 | Donna J. Papa | 47–13 | 15–5 | 1–1 | 2–2 | 17 |
| 2010 | Donna J. Papa | 42–20 | 11–10 | 1–1 | 2–2 | 24 |
| 2011 | Donna J. Papa | 34–21 | 13–7 | 2–1 | — | — |
| 2012 | Donna J. Papa | 43–15 | 13–4 | 1–1 | 2–2 | 24 |
| 2013 | Donna J. Papa | 40–21 | 13–8 | 1–1 | 1–2 | — |
| 2014 | Donna J. Papa | 24–26 | 14–11 | 1–1 | — | — |
| 2015 | Donna J. Papa | 37–16 | 16–5 | 1–1 | 1–2 | — |
| 2016 | Donna J. Papa | 32–25 | 13–11 | 1–1 | 1–2 | — |
| 2017 | Donna J. Papa | 40–21 | 14–9 | 2–1 | 2–2 | — |
| 2018 | Donna J. Papa | 30–26 | 15–8 | 1–1 | — | — |
| 2019 | Donna J. Papa | 38–20 | 17–7 | 2–1 | 3–2 | — |
| 2020 | Donna J. Papa | 10–14 | 3–3 | Covid-19 | Covid-19 | — |
| 2021 | Donna J. Papa | 14–26 | 10–19 | 0–1 | — | — |
| 2022 | Donna J. Papa | 23–28 | 6–18 | — | — | — |
| 2023 | Donna J. Papa | 26–28 | 13–10 | 0–1 | — | — |
| 2024 | Megan Smith Lyon | 30–20 | 10–14 | — | — | — |
| 2025 | Megan Smith Lyon | 40–14 | 15–9 | — | — | — |
| Overall | | 1640–994–6 | 313–226 | 33–44 | 20–30 | |

== See also ==
- List of NCAA Division I softball programs
