= 1991 NCAA Division I softball season =

American college softball season

- Defending Champions: UCLA

Tournament

Women's College World Series
- Duration: May 23–26, 1991
- Champions: Arizona (1st title)
- Runners-up: UCLA (9th WCWS Appearance)
- Winning Coach: Mike Candrea (1st title)

Seasons
- ← 1990 1992 →

The 1991 NCAA Division I softball season, play of college softball in the United States organized by the National Collegiate Athletic Association (NCAA) at the Division I level, began in February 1991. The season progressed through the regular season, many conference tournaments and championship series, and concluded with the 1991 NCAA Division I softball tournament and 1991 Women's College World Series. The Women's College World Series, consisting of the eight remaining teams in the NCAA Tournament and held in Oklahoma City at ASA Hall of Fame Stadium, ended on May 26, 1991.

== Conference standings ==
1991 Big Ten Conference softball standings
	Conf.						Overall
Team	W		L		T	PCT	W		L		T	PCT
Minnesota ‍†‍‍^{y}	20	–	4	–	0	.833	48	–	27	–	0	.640
Iowa ‍‍‍^{y}	19	–	5	–	0	.792	53	–	11	–	0	.828
Michigan ‍‍‍	15	–	9	–	0	.625	36	–	19	–	0	.655
Ohio State ‍‍‍	10	–	14	–	0	.417	20	–	32	–	0	.385
Indiana ‍‍‍	9	–	15	–	0	.375	23	–	31	–	0	.426
Northwestern ‍‍‍	9	–	15	–	0	.375	21	–	33	–	0	.389
Michigan State ‍‍‍	2	–	22	–	0	.083	11	–	41	–	0	.212
† – Conference champion y – Invited to the NCAA tournament

1991 Pacific-10 Conference softball standings
	Conf.				Overall
Team	W		L	PCT	W		L	PCT
UCLA ‍†‍‍^{y}	16	–	4	.800	50	–	5	.909
Arizona State ‍‍‍^{y}	15	–	5	.750	43	–	16	.729
California ‍‍‍^{y}	14	–	6	.700	48	–	18	.727
Arizona ‍‍‍^{y}	11	–	9	.550	56	–	16	.778
Oregon ‍‍‍	4	–	16	.200	29	–	29	.500
Oregon State ‍‍‍	0	–	20	.000	9	–	43	.173
† – Conference champion y – Invited to the NCAA tournament

1991 Southland Conference softball standings
	Conf.						Overall
Team	W		L		T	PCT	W		L		T	PCT
Northwestern Louisiana ‍†‍‍	18	–	5	–	0	.783	44	–	18	–	0	.710
Sam Houston State ‍‍‍	18	–	6	–	0	.750	37	–	23	–	0	.617
Stephen F. Austin ‍‍‍	17	–	6	–	0	.739	38	–	16	–	0	.704
Southwest Texas State ‍‍‍	10	–	14	–	0	.417	17	–	37	–	0	.315
Texas–Arlington ‍‍‍	9	–	15	–	0	.375	21	–	38	–	0	.356
McNeese State ‍‍‍	5	–	17	–	0	.227	11	–	33	–	0	.250
Northeast Louisiana ‍‍‍	4	–	18	–	0	.182	21	–	36	–	0	.368
† – Conference champion y – Invited to the NCAA tournament

== Women's College World Series ==
The 1991 NCAA Women's College World Series took place from May 23 to May 26, 1991 in Oklahoma City.

Upper round 1
Florida State	0
UCLA	1
UNLV	0
Arizona	1^{13}
Long Beach State	1
Missouri	0
Fresno State	2
Utah	0

Upper round 2
UCLA	0
Arizona	1^{9}
Long Beach State	3
Fresno State	0
Lower round 1
Florida State	3
UNLV	1
Missouri	2^{9}
Utah	0

Upper final
Arizona	1^{8}
Long Beach State	0
Lower round 2
Fresno State	3
Florida State	0
Missouri	0
UCLA	5

Semifinals
Arizona	0
Fresno State	1^{8}
Long Beach State	0
UCLA	1^{11}

Preliminary final
Fresno State	1
UCLA	5^{13}

Final
Arizona	5
UCLA	1

== Season leaders ==
Batting

- Batting average: .581 – Stacy Cowen, Manhattan Jaspers
- RBIs: 70 – Danielle Yearick, Manhattan Jaspers
- Home runs: 12 – Sue Hellman, Wagner Seahawks

Pitching

- Wins: 36-7 – Missi Young, Texas A&M Aggies
- ERA: 0.18 (6 ER/232.2 IP) – Karen Snelgrove, Missouri Tigers
- Strikeouts: 463 – Michele Granger, California Golden Bears

== Records ==
NCAA Division I single game walks: 6 – Wendy Stewart, Utah Utes; May 11, 1991

NCAA Division I 7 inning single game strikeouts: 21 – Michele Granger, California Golden Bears; March 22, 1991

NCAA Division I single game innings pitched: 31.0 – Kelly Brookhart, Creighton Bluejays & Janet Womack, Utah Utes; May 11, 1991

Freshman class single game home runs: 3 – Danielle Yearick, Manhattan Jaspers; April 20, 1991

Sophomore class single game innings pitched: 25.0 – Mellissa Halkinrude, Utah Utes; May 12, 1991

Junior class batting average: .581 – Stacy Cowen, Manhattan Jaspers

== Awards ==
- Honda Sports Award Softball:

Lisa Fernandez, UCLA Bruins

YEAR	W	L	GP	GS	CG	SHO	SV	IP	H	R	ER	BB	SO	ERA	WHIP
1991	20	3	26	24	23	16	1	165.2	68	9	6	22	165	0.25	0.54

YEAR	G	AB	R	H	BA	RBI	HR	3B	2B	TB	SLG	BB	SO	SB	SBA
1991	63	205	25	70	.341	32	2	1	9	87	.424%	17	2	0	0

== All America Teams ==
The following players were members of the All-American Teams.

First Team

Position	Player	Class	School
P	Heather Compton	SO.	UCLA Bruins
P	Terry Carpenter	JR.	Fresno State Bulldogs
P	Michele Granger	SO.	California Golden Bears
C	Diane Pohl	JR.	Iowa Hawkeyes
1B	Julie Cavanaugh	SR.	Oregon Ducks
2B	Julie Smith	SR.	Fresno State Bulldogs
3B	Camille Spitaleri	JR.	Kansas Jayhawks
SS	Julie Standering	SR.	Arizona Wildcats
OF	Yvonne Gutierrez	JR.	UCLA Bruins
OF	Pam Stanley	JR.	Central Michigan Chippewas
OF	Tricia Popowski	SR.	South Carolina Gamecocks
UT	Lisa Fernandez	SO.	UCLA Bruins

Second Team

Position	Player	Class	School
P	Karen Snelgrove	JR.	Missouri Tigers
P	Karen Jackson	FR.	Iowa Hawkeyes
P	Missi Young	SO.	Texas A&M Aggies
C	Erica Ziencina	SR.	UCLA Bruins
1B	Julie Jones	SR.	Arizona Wildcats
2B	Michelle Delloso	SR.	South Carolina Gamecocks
3B	Gina LoPiccolo	SR.	Fresno State Bulldogs
SS	Tiffany Tootle	SO.	South Carolina Gamecocks
OF	Rachel Brown	JR.	Arizona State Sun Devils
OF	Leigh Ross	SR.	Toledo Rockets
OF	Charmelle Green	SR.	Utah Utes
UT	Kelly Brookhart	SR.	Creighton Bluejays
AT-L	Kari Blank	JR.	Minnesota Golden Gophers

Third Team

Position	Player	Class	School
P	Lori Harrigan	JR.	UNLV Rebels
P	Debbie Day	JR.	Arizona Wildcats
P	Christy Larsen	SR.	FSU Seminoles
C	Rhonda Rube	JR.	Northwestern State Demons
1B	Julie Liljeberg	SR.	Western Michigan Broncos
2B	Missy Phillips	SR.	UCLA Bruins
3B	Kim Kostyk	JR.	Long Beach State 49ers
SS	Shauna Bowman	SR.	Ohio State Buckeyes
OF	Dorsey Steamer	JR.	ULL Rajin' Cajuns
OF	Mich DeBree	SR.	Cal State Fullerton Titans
OF	Colleen Holloway	SO.	Southern Illinois Salukis
UT	Julie Sexton	SR.	Northern Illinois Huskies
AT-L	Chris Parris	SR.	UNLV Rebels
