= List of UConn Huskies softball seasons =

This is a list of UConn Huskies softball seasons. The UConn Huskies softball program is a college softball team that represents the University of Connecticut in the Big East Conference of the National Collegiate Athletic Association.

The Huskies have won eight conference regular season championships, ten conference tournaments, and have appeared in the NCAA Division I softball tournament ten times, advancing to the Women's College World Series in 1993.

== Season results ==
National champions	Women's College World Series berth	NCAA Tournament berth	Conference Tournament Champions	Conference Regular Season Champions

Season	Head coach	Conference	Season results									Tournament results	
Season	Head coach	Conference	Overall				Conference					Conference	Postseason
Season	Head coach	Conference	Wins	Losses	Ties	%	Wins	Losses	Ties	%	Finish	Conference	Postseason
UConn Huskies
1975	Linda Hanson	Independent	4	4	0	.500	N/A						—
1976	Linda Hanson	Independent	2	9	0	.182	N/A						—
1977	Linda Hanson	Independent	5	9	0	.357	N/A						—
1978	Linda Hanson	Independent	15	7	0	.682	N/A						AIAW Regional
1979	Linda Hanson	Independent	17	6	1	.729	N/A						AIAW Regional
1980	Linda Hanson	Independent	21	6	0	.778	N/A						AIAW Regional
1981	Linda Hanson	Independent	17	8	0	.680	N/A						AIAW Regional
1982	Ruth Mead	Independent	14	11	0	.560	N/A						—
1983	Ruth Mead	Independent	17	11	0	.607	N/A						—
1984	Karen Mullins	Independent	22	2	0	.917	N/A						
1985	Karen Mullins	Independent	34	7	0	.829	N/A					ECAC Tournament Champions	—
1986	Karen Mullins	Independent	30	17	1	.635	N/A					ECAC Tournament	—
1987	Karen Mullins	Independent	27	7	1	.786	N/A					—	—
1988	Karen Mullins	Independent	34	13	0	.723	N/A					—	—
1989	Karen Mullins	Independent	29	12	0	.707	N/A					—	NCAA Regional
1990	Karen Mullins	Big East	34	9	0	.791	N/A					Big East Tournament Champions	NCAA Regional
1991	Karen Mullins	Big East	35	18	1	.657	N/A					Big East Tournament Champions	NCAA Regional
1992	Karen Mullins	Big East	42	10	0	.808	6	0	0	1.000	1st	Big East Tournament Champions	NCAA Regional
1993	Karen Mullins	Big East	45	14	0	.763	17	1	0	.944	1st	Big East Tournament Champions	WCWS
1994	Karen Mullins	Big East	29	18	0	.617	15	2	0	.882	1st	Big East Tournament	—
1995	Karen Mullins	Big East	37	20	0	.649	16	3	0	.842	1st (North)	Big East Tournament Champions	NCAA Regional
1996	Karen Mullins	Big East	36	22	0	.621	16	4	0	.800	1st (North)	Big East Tournament Champions	NCAA Regional
1997	Karen Mullins	Big East	30	20	0	.600	15	1	0	.938	1st (North)	Big East Tournament	—
1998	Karen Mullins	Big East	24	21	1	.533	8	7	0	.533	2nd (North)	Big East Tournament	—
1999	Karen Mullins	Big East	23	23	0	.500	9	7	0	.563	4th	Big East Tournament	—
2000	Karen Mullins	Big East	37	17	0	.685	12	4	0	.750	2nd	Big East Tournament	—
2001	Karen Mullins	Big East	36	23	0	.610	14	6	0	.700	3rd	Big East Tournament Champions	NCAA Regionals
2002	Karen Mullins	Big East	13	36	0	.265	5	15	0	.250	T-10th	—	—
2003	Karen Mullins	Big East	24	23	1	.510	12	8	0	.600	5th	—	—
2004	Karen Mullins	Big East	23	23	0	.500	6	12	0	.333	10th	—	—
2005	Karen Mullins	Big East	20	25	0	.444	8	10	0	.444	6th	—	—
2006	Karen Mullins	Big East	19	29	0	.396	6	14	0	.300	10th	—	—
2007	Karen Mullins	Big East	22	21	0	.512	10	9	0	.526	5th	Big East Tournament	—
2008	Karen Mullins	Big East	22	22	0	.500	13	7	0	.650	3rd	Big East Tournament	—
2009	Karen Mullins	Big East	29	22	0	.569	11	12	0	.478	6th	Big East Tournament	—
2010	Karen Mullins	Big East	21	30	0	.412	7	15	0	.318	11th	—	—
2011	Karen Mullins	Big East	19	30	0	.388	6	15	0	.286	11th	—	—
2012	Karen Mullins	Big East	21	27	0	.438	9	13	0	.409	8th	Big East Tournament	—
2013	Karen Mullins	Big East	26	27	0	.491	8	14	0	.364	10th	—	—
2014	Karen Mullins	American	13	38	0	.255	3	17	0	.150	8th	AAC tournament	—
2015	Jen McIntyre	American	18	35	0	.340	4	13	0	.235	7th	AAC tournament	—
2016	Jen McIntyre	American	19	33	0	.365	4	12	0	.250	7th	AAC tournament	—
2017	Jen McIntyre	American	17	30	0	.362	3	14	0	.176	7th	AAC tournament	—
2018	Jen McIntyre	American	20	35	0	.364	5	16	0	.238	8th	AAC tournament	—
2019	Jen McIntyre	American	21	29	0	.420	8	13	0	.381	6th	AAC tournament	—
2020	Laura Valentino	American	16	5	0	.762	Season canceled due to COVID-19 pandemic						
2021	Laura Valentino	Big East	22	20	0	.524	12	9	0	.571	3rd	Big East Tournament, 2nd	—
2022	Laura Valentino	Big East	38	18	0	.679	20	4	0	.833	1st	Big East Tournament, 2nd	—
2023	Laura Valentino	Big East	34	15	0	.694	19	5	0	.792	1st	Big East Tournament, 3rd	—
2024	Laura Valentino	Big East	31	24	0	.564	16	8	0	.667	2nd	Big East Tournament, 3rd	—
2025	Laura Valentino	Big East	35	19	0	.648	18	6	0	.750	2nd	Big East Tournament Champions	NCAA Regional
2026	Laura Valentino	Big East	32	28	0	.544	18	6	0	.750	T-1st	Big East Tournament Champions	NCAA Regional
