= 2023 UConn Huskies softball team =

American college softball season

2023 UConn Huskies softball

Big East regular season champion
- Conference: Big East Conference
- Record: 34–15 (19–5 Big East)
- Head coach: Laura Valentino (4th season)
- Home stadium: Connecticut Softball Stadium

2023 Big East Conference softball standings
	Conf.				Overall
Team	W		L	PCT	W		L	PCT
UConn ‍†‍‍	19	–	5	.792	34	–	15	.694
Seton Hall ‍‍‡‍^{y}	18	–	6	.750	42	–	16	.724
Villanova ‍‍‍	18	–	6	.750	37	–	21	.638
Butler ‍‍‍	12	–	9	.571	18	–	35	.340
St. John's ‍‍‍	8	–	13	.381	23	–	29	.442
DePaul ‍‍‍	9	–	15	.375	19	–	32	.373
Georgetown ‍‍‍	9	–	15	.375	16	–	32	.333
Creighton ‍‍‍	6	–	18	.250	23	–	31	.426
Providence ‍‍‍	6	–	18	.250	15	–	32	.319
† – Conference champion ‡ – Tournament champion y – Invited to the NCAA Tournament; As of May 20, 2023; Rankings from NFCA/USA Today

The 2023 UConn Huskies softball team represented the University of Connecticut in the 2023 NCAA Division I softball season. The Huskies were led by Laura Valentino in her 4th year as head coach, and played as part of the Big East Conference. They played their home games at Connecticut Softball Stadium. They won a second-straight Big East Conference regular season championship and reached the semifinals of the Big East Tournament, but fell to Villanova for the third year in a row.

== Previous season ==
UConn finished with a final record of 38–18, and finished first in the Big East with a conference record of 20–4. They reached the final of the Big East tournament, but fell to Villanova for the second year in a row.

== Personnel ==
=== Roster ===
2023 Connecticut Huskies roster
Pitchers: 00 - Payton Kinney - Junior; 7 - Hope Jenkins - Freshman; 13 - Delaney Nagy - Sophomore; 16 - Meghan O'Neil - Senior; Catchers: 4 - Lauren Benson - Junior; 17 - Grace Jenkins - Freshman	Outfielders: 5 - Aziah James - Graduate Student; 12 - Kaitlyn Kibling - Freshman; 14 - Lexi Hastings - Sophomore; 15 - Savannah Ring - Freshman; 19 - Grace Lurz - Freshman; Utility: 2 - Giuliana Abruscato - Junior	Infielders: 3 - Taylor Zatyk - Junior; 10 - Rosie Garcia - Sophomore; 22 - Haley Coupal - Freshman; 23 - Jana Sanden - Junior; 31 - Makenzie Mason - Junior

=== Coaches ===
2023 Connecticut Huskies softball coaching staff
- Laura Valentino – Head coach – 4th season
- Christie Novatin – Associate head coach – 4th season
- Molly Rathbun – Assistant coach – 1st season

== Schedule ==
Legend
	UConn win
	UConn loss
	Cancellation
**Bold**	UConn team member
*	Non-Conference game

2023 UConn Huskies softball game log
Regular season

February
Date	Opponent	Rank	Site/stadium	Score	Win	Loss	Save	Attendance	Overall record	BE Record
Feb 10	at Georgia Tech*		Shirley Clements Mewborn Field • Atlanta, GA	**W** 6–5	**Jenkins (1–0)**	Dennis (0–1)	None	536	1–0	
Feb 10	at Georgia Tech*		Shirley Clements Mewborn Field • Atlanta, GA	**L** 1–2	Neleman (1–0)	**Payton (1–0)**	None	351	1–1	
Feb 11	vs North Texas*		Shirley Clements Mewborn Field • Atlanta, GA	**L** 2–10	Savage (1–0)	**Jenkins (1–1)**	None	178	1–2	
Feb 17	vs Bowling Green*		Katie Seashole Pressly Softball Stadium • Gainesville, FL	**W** 13–1	**O'Neill (1–0)**	Stepp (1–1)	None		2–2	
Feb 17	at No. 3 Florida*		Katie Seashole Pressly Softball Stadium • Gainesville, FL	**L** 1–9	Hightower (3–0)	**Kinney (3–0)**	None	2,623	2–3	
Feb 18	at No. 3 Florida*		Katie Seashole Pressly Softball Stadium • Gainesville, FL	**L** 3–4	Hightower (5–0)	**Kinney (0–3)**	None	2,219	2–4	
Feb 18	vs Central Michigan*		Katie Seashole Pressly Softball Stadium • Gainesville, FL	**W** 3–2	**Nagy (1–0)**	Bean (0–1)	**Jenkins (1)**	2,219	3–4	
Feb 19	vs Bowling Green*		Katie Seashole Pressly Softball Stadium • Gainesville, FL	**W** 5–4	**O'Neil (2–0)**	Davis (0–3)	None		4–4	
Feb 24	at UNC Greensboro*		UNCG Softball Stadium • Greensboro, NC	**W** 3–1	**Jenkins (2–1)**	Spell (2–1)	**Kinney (1)**	178	5–4	
Feb 25	vs Delaware*		UNCG Softball Stadium • Greensboro, NC	**L** 4–6	Winburn (3–4)	**O'Neil (2–1)**	None	112	5–5	
Feb 25	at UNC Greensboro*		UNCG Softball Stadium • Greensboro, NC	**W** 2–0	**Kinney (1–3)**	Ward (2–1)	None	128	6–5	
Feb 26	vs Indiana*		UNCG Softball Stadium • Greensboro, NC	**W** 5–0	**Jenkins (3–1)**	Johnson (2–6)	**Kinney (2)**	137	7–5	

March
Date	Opponent	Rank	Site/stadium	Score	Win	Loss	Save	Attendance	Overall record	BE Record
Mar 4	at Liberty*		Kamphuis Field at Liberty Softball Stadium • Lynchburg, VA							
Mar 4	vs Radford*		Kamphuis Field at Liberty Softball Stadium • Lynchburg, VA							
Mar 5	vs Iona*		Kamphuis Field at Liberty Softball Stadium • Lynchburg, VA							
Mar 5	vs Iona*		Kamphuis Field at Liberty Softball Stadium • Lynchburg, VA							
Mar 10	Seton Hall		Connecticut Softball Stadium • Storrs, CT							
Mar 11	Seton Hall		Connecticut Softball Stadium • Storrs, CT							
Mar 12	Seton Hall		Connecticut Softball Stadium • Storrs, CT							
Mar 17	at Providence		Glay Field • Providence, RI							
Mar 18	at Providence		Glay Field • Providence, RI							
Mar 19	at Providence		Glay Field • Providence, RI							
Mar 21	Boston College*		Connecticut Softball Stadium • Storrs, CT							
Mar 24	Georgetown		Connecticut Softball Stadium • Storrs, CT							
Mar 25	Georgetown		Connecticut Softball Stadium • Storrs, CT							
Mar 26	Georgetown		Connecticut Softball Stadium • Storrs, CT							
Mar 28	at Boston University*		Boston University Softball Field • Boston, MA							
Mar 31	at Villanova		Villanova Softball Complex • Villanova, PA							

April/May
Date	Opponent	Rank	Site/stadium	Score	Win	Loss	Save	Attendance	Overall record	BE Record
Apr 1	at Villanova		Villanova Softball Complex • Villanova, PA							
Apr 2	at Villanova		Villanova Softball Complex • Villanova, PA							
Apr 4	Fairfield*		Connecticut Softball Stadium • Storrs, CT							
Apr 5	UMass*		Connecticut Softball Stadium • Storrs, CT							
Apr 7	St. John's		Connecticut Softball Stadium • Storrs, CT							
Apr 8	St. John's		Connecticut Softball Stadium • Storrs, CT							
Apr 9	St. John's		Connecticut Softball Stadium • Storrs, CT							
Apr 11	at Boston College*		Boston College Softball Field • Brighton, MA							
Apr 14	Butler		Connecticut Softball Stadium • Storrs, CT							
Apr 15	Butler		Connecticut Softball Stadium • Storrs, CT							
Apr 16	Butler		Connecticut Softball Stadium • Storrs, CT							
Apr 19	Hostra*		Connecticut Softball Stadium • Storrs, CT							
Apr 21	at Creighton		Creighton Sports Complex • Omaha, NE							
Apr 22	at Creighton		Creighton Sports Complex • Omaha, NE							
Apr 23	at Creighton		Creighton Sports Complex • Omaha, NE							
Apr 28	at DePaul		Cacciatore Stadium • Chicago, IL							
Apr 29	at DePaul		Cacciatore Stadium • Chicago, IL							
Apr 30	at DePaul		Cacciatore Stadium • Chicago, IL							
May 7	Saint Peter's		Connecticut Softball Stadium • Storrs, CT							

Post-Season

Big East Tournament
Date	Opponent	Seed	Site/stadium	Score	Win	Loss	Save	Attendance	Overall record	BET Record
May 10–13	TBD		Connecticut Softball Stadium • Storrs, CT							

Rankings from NFCA Poll, Tournament seeds in parentheses.
