= 2022 UConn Huskies softball team =

American college softball season

2022 UConn Huskies softball

Big East regular season champion
- Conference: Big East Conference
- Record: 38–18 (20–4 Big East)
- Head coach: Laura Valentino (3rd season)
- Home stadium: Connecticut Softball Stadium

2022 Big East Conference softball standings
	Conf.				Overall
Team	W		L	PCT	W		L	PCT
UConn ‍†‍‍	20	–	4	.833	38	–	18	.679
Butler ‍‍‍	16	–	6	.727	31	–	17	.646
Villanova ‍‍‡‍^{y}	16	–	7	.696	32	–	24	.571
DePaul ‍‍‍	16	–	8	.667	29	–	24	.547
Providence ‍‍‍	11	–	13	.458	25	–	21	.543
Seton Hall ‍‍‍	9	–	14	.391	20	–	23	.465
Georgetown ‍‍‍	5	–	16	.238	15	–	28	.349
Creighton ‍‍‍	5	–	17	.227	15	–	27	.357
St. John's ‍‍‍	5	–	18	.217	12	–	35	.255
† – Conference champion ‡ – Tournament champion As of June 5, 2022; Rankings from NFCA/USA Today

The 2022 UConn Huskies softball team represented the University of Connecticut in the 2022 NCAA Division I softball season. The Huskies were led by Laura Valentino in her 3rd year as head coach, and play as part of the Big East Conference after joining the conference for the 2020–21 academic year. They played their home games at the newly rebuilt Connecticut Softball Stadium.

The Huskies claimed their first Big East regular season title in 26 years, and lost in the championship game of the 2022 Big East Conference softball tournament to Villanova.

== Previous season ==
UConn finished with a final record of 22–20, and finished third in the Big East with a conference record of 12–9. They reached the final of the Big East Tournament, but fell to Villanova.

== Personnel ==
=== Roster ===
2022 Connecticut Huskies roster
Pitchers: 00 - Payton Kinney - Sophomore; 13 - Delaney Nagy - Freshman; 16 - Meghan O'Neil - Junior; 17 - Marybeth Olson - Graduate Student; 18 - Elise Sokolsky - Freshman; Catchers: 4 - Lauren Benson - Sophomore; 22 - Madisyn Estorga - Sophomore; 33 - Erika Coreth - Graduate Student	Outfielders: 1 - Hollis Wivell - (redshirt) Senior; 5 - Aziah James - Senior; 14 - Lexi Hastings - Freshman; 19 - Reese Guevarra - Graduate Student; Utility: 2 - Giuliana Abruscato - Sophomore; 15 - Sami Barnett - (redshirt) Senior	Infielders: 3 - Taylor Zatyk - Sophomore; 6 - Rileigh De Weese - Sophomore; 8 - Briana Marcelino - Graduate Student; 9 - Olivia Sappington - Graduate Student; 10 - Rosie Garcia - Freshman; 11 - Mackenzie Fitzpatrick - Junior; 23 - Jana Sanden - Sophomore; 24 - Emily Piergustavo - Senior; 31 - Makenzie Mason - Sophomore

=== Coaches ===
2022 Connecticut Huskies softball coaching staff
- Laura Valentino – Head coach – 3rd season
- Christie Novatin – Associate head coach – 3rd season
- Kyle Brady – Assistant coach – 1st season
- Nikki Cuccio – Volunteer assistant coach – 1st season

== Schedule ==
Legend
	UConn win
	UConn loss
	Cancellation
**Bold**	UConn team member
*	Non-Conference game

2022 UConn Huskies softball game log
Regular season

February
Date	Opponent	Site/stadium	Score	Win	Loss	Save	Attendance	Overall record	BE Record
Feb 11	vs No. 11 Missouri*	Sleepy Hollow Sports Complex • Leesburg, FL (Northern Lights/Southern Nights)	**W** 6–2	**Olson (1–0)**	Krings (0–1)	**Sokolsky (1)**	200	1–0	
Feb 11	vs Northwestern*	Sleepy Hollow Sports Complex • Leesburg, FL (Northern Lights/Southern Nights)	**L** 0–8	Williams (1–0)	**Sokolsky (0–1)**	None		1–1	
Feb 12	vs Michigan State*	Sleepy Hollow Sports Complex • Leesburg, FL (Northern Lights/Southern Nights)	**L** 0–6	Miller (2–0)	**Sokolsky (0–2)**	None		1–2	
Feb 12	vs Penn State*	Sleepy Hollow Sports Complex • Leesburg, FL (Northern Lights/Southern Nights)	**W** 2–1	**Sokolsky (1–1)**	Parshall (0–1)	None		2–2	
Feb 13	vs Wisconsin*	Sleepy Hollow Sports Complex • Leesburg, FL (Northern Lights/Southern Nights)	**L** 3–4	Schwartz (1–0)	**Olson (1–1)**	None		2–3	
Feb 18	at Charlotte*	Sue M. Daughtridge Stadium • Charlotte, NC	**L** 0–8	Wright (1–1)	**Olson (1–2)**	None	200	2–4	
Feb 18	vs Campbell*	Sue M. Daughtridge Stadium • Charlotte, NC	**W** 10–2	**O'Neil (1–0)**	Barefoot (2–1)	None	75	3–4	
Feb 19	vs No. 22 James Madison*	Sue M. Daughtridge Stadium • Charlotte, NC	**L** 5–9	Bermudez (1–0)	**O'Neil (1–1)**	None	182	3–5	
Feb 20	vs No. 22 James Madison*	Sue M. Daughtridge Stadium • Charlotte, NC	**L** 5–11	Humphrey (1–1)	**O'Neil (1–2)**	None	102	3–6	
Feb 25	vs Western Carolina*	CofC Softball Stadium at Patriot's Point • Mount Pleasant, SC	**W** 4–0	**O'Neil (2–2)**	Juett (1–2)	**Nagy (1)**	75	4–6	
Feb 25	at College of Charleston*	CofC Softball Stadium at Patriot's Point • Mount Pleasant, SC	**W** 6–0	**Olson (2–2)**	Lemire (0–4)	None	100	5–6	
Feb 26	vs Appalachian State*	CofC Softball Stadium at Patriot's Point • Mount Pleasant, SC	**W** 2–1	**O'Neil (3–2)**	Nichols (1–1)	None	75	6–6	
Feb 26	vs Western Carolina*	CofC Softball Stadium at Patriot's Point • Mount Pleasant, SC	**W** 8–0	**Sokolsky (2–2)**	Rice (3–2)	None	100	7–6	
Feb 27	vs Appalachian State*	CofC Softball Stadium at Patriot's Point • Mount Pleasant, SC	**W** 7–6	**Sokolsy (3–2)**	Buckner (4–1)	None	200	8–6	

March
Date	Opponent	Site/stadium	Score	Win	Loss	Save	Attendance	Overall record	BE Record
Mar 4	vs UNC Greensboro*	Williams Field at Anderson Stadium • Chapel Hill, NC (UNC Tournament)	**L** 2–6	Scott (6–3)	**O'Neil (3–3)**	None	103	8–7	
Mar 5	vs No. 12 Oregon*	Williams Field at Anderson Stadium • Chapel Hill, NC (UNC Tournament)	**L** 1–9	Kliethermes (6–2)	**Olson (2–3)**	None	242	8–8	
Mar 5	vs Penn State*	Williams Field at Anderson Stadium • Chapel Hill, NC (UNC Tournament)	**W** 7–1	**Sokolsky (4–2)**	Lingenfelter (3–4)	None	206	9–8	
Mar 6	vs No. 12 Oregon*	Williams Field at Anderson Stadium • Chapel Hill, NC (UNC Tournament)	**L** 3–9	Hansen (3–0)	**Sokolsky (4–3)**	None	138	9–9	
Mar 6	at North Carolina*	Williams Field at Anderson Stadium • Chapel Hill, NC (UNC Tournament)	**L** 7–8	George	**O'Neil (3–3)**	Myrtle (1)	238	9–10	
Mar 11	at St. John's	Red Storm Field • Queens, NY	**W** 8–0	**O'Neil (4–4)**	Mearns (2–7)	None	101	10–10	1–0
Mar 11	at St. John's	Red Storm Field • Queens, NY	**W** 11–1	**Sokolsky (5–3)**	Zamudio (1–7)	None	75	11–10	2–0
Mar 15	at St. John's	Red Storm Field • Queens, NY	**W** 5–0	**Sokolsky (6–3)**	Zamudio (1–8)	None	73	12–10	3–0
Mar 18	at Georgetown	Washington Nationals Youth Academy • Washington, D.C.	**W** 7–3	**Sokolsky (7–3)**	Dunn (5–2)	None	101	13–10	4–0
Mar 19	at Georgetown	Washington Nationals Youth Academy • Washington, D.C.	**L** 5–7	Dunn (6–2)	**Nagy (0–1)**	None	151	13–11	4–1
Mar 20	at Georgetown	Washington Nationals Youth Academy • Washington, D.C.	**W** 4–0	**O'Neil (5–4)**	Dunn (6–3)	None	79	14–11	5–1
Mar 23	Army*	Connecticut Softball Stadium • Storrs, CT	**W** 5–4	**Sokolsky (7–3)**	Farris (0–11)	None	211	15–11	
Mar 25	DePaul	Connecticut Softball Stadium • Storrs, CT	**W** 7–6	**Sokolsky (8–3)**	Hocker (2–6)	None	250	16–11	6–1
Mar 26	DePaul	Connecticut Softball Stadium • Storrs, CT	**W** 7–3	**Sokolsky (9–3)**	Lehman (4–5)	None	325	17–11	7–1
Mar 27	DePaul	Connecticut Softball Stadium • Storrs, CT	**W** 10–2	**Olson (3–3)**	Hocker (2–7)	None	220	18–11	8–1
Mar 30	Boston University*	Connecticut Softball Stadium • Storrs, CT	**L** 2–5	Boaz (11–4)	**O'Neil (7–5)**	None	192	18–12	

April
Date	Opponent	Site/stadium	Score	Win	Loss	Save	Attendance	Overall record	BE Record
Apr 1	at Butler	Butler Softball Field • Indianapolis, IN	**L** 2–6	Ricketts (9–2)	**O'Neil (7–6)**	None	151	18–13	8–2
Apr 2	at Butler	Butler Softball Field • Indianapolis, IN	**W** 5–0	**Sokolsy (10–3)**	Griman (2–5)	None	140	19–13	9–2
Apr 3	at Butler	Butler Softball Field • Indianapolis, IN	**W** 3–0	**Sokolsy (11–3)**	Rickets (9–3)	None	145	20–13	10–2
Apr 6	at UMass*	UMass Softball Complex • Amherst, MA	**W** 15–0	**Sokolsky (12–3)**	Bolton (5–6)	None	79	21–13	
Apr 8	Creighton	Connecticut Softball Stadium • Storrs, CT	**W** 5–4	**Sokolsky (13–3)**	Mullally (4–4)	**Olson (1)**	260	22–13	11–2
Apr 9	Creighton	Connecticut Softball Stadium • Storrs, CT	**W** 7–3	**Sokolsky (14–3)**	Mullally (4–5)	None	350	23–13	12–2
Apr 10	Creighton	Connecticut Softball Stadium • Storrs, CT	**W** 13–5	**O'Neil (8–6)**	Lawrence (2–3)	None	410	24–13	13–2
Apr 12	Rhode Island*	Connecticut Softball Stadium • Storrs, CT	**W** 12–8	**O'Neil (9–6)**	Lynchard (6–17)	None	200	25–13	
Apr 13	Fairfield*	Connecticut Softball Stadium • Storrs, CT	**W** 4–1	**Olson (3–3)**	Rhinehart (0–4)	None	270	26–13	
Apr 15	Providence	Connecticut Softball Stadium • Storrs, CT	**W** 3–1	**Sokolsky (15–3)**	Grifone (9–7)	**Olson (2)**	415	27–13	14–2
Apr 16	Providence	Connecticut Softball Stadium • Storrs, CT	**L** 1–2	Alvarez (8–3)	**Sokolsky (15–4)**	None	420	27–14	14–3
Apr 17	Providence	Connecticut Softball Stadium • Storrs, CT	**W** 8–0	**Sokolsky (16–4)**	Alvarez (8–4)	None	280	28–14	15–3
Apr 20	at Merrimack*	Martone-Mejail Field • North Andover, MA	**W** 6–0	**Olson (4–3)**	Fornwalt (3–7)	None	58	29–14	
Apr 22	at Seton Hall	Mike Sheppard, Sr. Field • South Orange, NJ	**W** 6–1	**Sokolsky (17–4)**	Smith (9–11)	**Olson (3)**	193	30–14	16–3
Apr 23	at Seton Hall	Mike Sheppard, Sr. Field • South Orange, NJ	**W** 5–2	**O'Neill (10–6)**	Smith (9–12)	None	219	31–14	17–3
Apr 24	at Seton Hall	Mike Sheppard, Sr. Field • South Orange, NJ	**W** 14–5	**Sokolsky (18–4)**	Ehrenberg (2–2)	None	127	32–14	18–3
Apr 27	at Boston College*	Harrington Athletics Village • Brighton, MA	**W** 5–1	**Sokolsky (19–4)**	Schnackenber (8–7)	None	76	33–14	
Apr 30	St. Joseph's*	Connecticut Softball Stadium • Storrs, CT	**L** 2–5	Siler (11–1)	**Sokolsy (19–5)**	None	380	33–15	
Apr 30	St. Joseph's*	Connecticut Softball Stadium • Storrs, CT	**W** 1–0	**O'Neil (11–6)**	Herr (5–5)	None	380	34–15	

May
Date	Opponent	Site/stadium	Score	Win	Loss	Save	Attendance	Overall record	BE Record
May 6	Villanova	Connecticut Softball Stadium • Storrs, CT	**W** 4–3	**Olson (5–3)**	Pellicano (3–3)	None	380	35–15	19–3
May 7	Villanova	Connecticut Softball Stadium • Storrs, CT	**W** 3–0	**O'Neil (12–6)**	Kennedy (6–7)	None	300	36–15	20–3
May 8	Villanova	Connecticut Softball Stadium • Storrs, CT	**L** 2–4	White (6–6)	**O'Neil (12–7)**	None	325	36–16	20–4

Post-Season

Big East Tournament
Date	Opponent	Seed	Site/stadium	Score	Win	Loss	Save	Attendance	Overall record	BET Record
May 12	(4) DePaul	(1)	Cacciatore Stadium • Chicago, IL	**L** 2–6	Lehman (15–5)	**Sokolsky (19–6)**	None		36–17	0–1
May 12	(2) Butler	(1)	Cacciatore Stadium • Chicago, IL	**W** 4–1	**Sokolsky (20–6)**	Ricketts (14–6)	None	1,214	37–17	1–1
May 13	(4) DePaul	(1)	Cacciatore Stadium • Chicago, IL	**W** 6–2	**O'Neil (13–7)**	Hocker (7–10)	None		38–17	2–1
May 14	(3) Villanova	(1)	Cacciatore Stadium • Chicago, IL	**L** 0–3	Rauch (17–6)	**O'Neil (13–8)**	Kennedy (3)	195	38–18	2–2

Rankings from NFCA Poll, Tournament seeds in parentheses.
