= 2024 UConn Huskies softball team =

American college softball season

2024 UConn Huskies softball
- Conference: Big East Conference
- Record: 31–24 (16–8 Big East)
- Head coach: Laura Valentino (5th season)
- Home stadium: Connecticut Softball Stadium

2024 Big East Conference softball standings
	Conf.						Overall
Team	W		L		T	PCT	W		L		T	PCT
Villanova ‍†‍‡‍^{y}	19	–	5	–	0	.792	33	–	24	–	0	.579
Creighton ‍‍‍	16	–	8	–	0	.667	36	–	21	–	0	.632
UConn ‍‍‍	16	–	8	–	0	.667	31	–	24	–	0	.564
Seton Hall ‍‍‍	14	–	10	–	0	.583	27	–	23	–	0	.540
St. John's ‍‍‍	13	–	11	–	0	.542	31	–	27	–	0	.534
Providence ‍‍‍	11	–	13	–	0	.458	22	–	23	–	1	.489
Butler ‍‍‍	11	–	13	–	0	.458	23	–	29	–	0	.442
Georgetown ‍‍‍	4	–	20	–	0	.167	14	–	33	–	0	.298
DePaul ‍‍‍	4	–	20	–	0	.167	9	–	38	–	0	.191
† – Conference champion ‡ – Tournament champion y – Invited to the NCAA Tournament; As of May 19, 2024; Rankings from NFCA/USA Today

The 2024 UConn Huskies softball team represented the University of Connecticut in the 2024 NCAA Division I softball season. The Huskies were led by Laura Valentino in her 5th year as head coach, and play as part of the Big East Conference. They played their home games at Connecticut Softball Stadium.

The Huskies finished the regular season tied for second in the Big East and were eliminated by Creighton in the semifinals of the 2024 Big East softball tournament.

== Previous season ==
UConn finished with a final record of 34–15, and finished first in the Big East with a conference record of 19–5. They reached the semifinals of the Big East tournament, but fell to Villanova for the third year in a row.

== Personnel ==
=== Roster ===
2024 Connecticut Huskies roster
Pitchers: 00 - Payton Kinney - Senior; 7 - Hope Jenkins - Sophomore; 13 - Delaney Nagy - Junior; 16 - Meghan O'Neil - Graduate Student; 24 - Sydnee Koosh - Redshirt Freshman; 57 - Hallie Siems - Senior; Catchers: 4 - Lauren Benson - Senior; 5 - Sarah Blaskiewicz - Freshman; 17 - Grace Jenkins - Sophomore	Outfielders: 2 - Giuliana Abruscato - Senior; 11 - Kaitlyn Breslin - Freshman; 12 - Kaitlyn Kibling - Sophomore; 14 - Lexi Hastings - Junior; Utility: 22 - Haley Coupal - Sophomore	Infielders: 3 - Taylor Zatyk - Senior; 10 - Rosie Garcia - Junior; 15 - Savannah Ring - Sophomore; 19 - Caylee De Meo - Freshman; 21 - Rayah Snyder - Freshman; 23 - Jana Sanden - Senior

=== Coaches ===
2024 Connecticut Huskies softball coaching staff
- Laura Valentino – Head coach – 5th season
- Mackenzie Keyes – Assistant coach – 1st season
- Nikki Amodeo – Assistant coach – 1st season
