= 2026 UConn Huskies softball team =

American college softball season

2026 UConn Huskies softball

Big East regular season co-champions Big East tournament champions

NCAA College Station Regional, 1–2
- Conference: Big East Conference
- Record: 32–28 (18–6 Big East)
- Head coach: Laura Valentino (7th season)
- Home stadium: Connecticut Softball Stadium

2026 Big East Conference softball standings
	Conf.				Overall
Team	W		L	PCT	W		L	PCT
Providence ‍†‍‍	18	–	6	.750	29	–	20	.592
UConn ‍†‍‡‍^{y}	18	–	6	.750	32	–	27	.542
Creighton ‍‍‍	17	–	7	.708	32	–	27	.542
Butler ‍‍‍	15	–	9	.625	25	–	21	.543
St. John's ‍‍‍	9	–	15	.375	32	–	23	.582
Georgetown ‍‍‍	9	–	15	.375	16	–	26	.381
DePaul ‍‍‍	8	–	16	.333	20	–	30	.400
Villanova ‍‍‍	8	–	16	.333	14	–	39	.264
Seton Hall ‍‍‍	6	–	18	.250	19	–	30	.388
† – Conference champion ‡ – Tournament champion y – Invited to the NCAA Tournament; As of May 17, 2026; Rankings from NFCA/USA Today

The 2026 UConn Huskies softball team represented the University of Connecticut in the 2026 NCAA Division I softball season. The Huskies were led by Laura Valentino in her 7th year as head coach, and competed as part of the Big East Conference. They played their home games at Connecticut Softball Stadium.

Due to expected weather conditions in North Carolina, the Elon Softball Classic was canceled and the Huskies instead entered the JoAnne Graf Classic at Florida State for the opening weekend.

The Huskies claimed a share of the regular season Big East title with an 18–6 record. They entered the Big East Tournament as the second seed, as Providence held the tiebreaker by winning the season series. UConn won their second Big East Tournament in a row with a 8–3 victory over Creighton in the winner-take-all final. They were selected to the NCAA College Station Regional, facing 15th national seeded Texas A&M in the first round. They won their first game in NCAA tournament play since 2001 by defeating McNeese, but were eliminated by a pair of losses to Texas A&M.

== Previous season ==
The Huskies finished the regular season with an 18–6 record and entered the 2025 Big East Conference softball tournament as the second seed. They won the Big East tournament and advanced to the NCAA tournament for the first time since 2001. They lost to Nebraska and host LSU to end their season.

== Personnel ==
=== Roster ===
2026 Connecticut Huskies roster
Pitchers: 4 - Stella Kiemele - Sophomore; 9 - Caprice Bohmer - Freshman; 13 - Alexandra Bacher - Sophomore; 23 - Amber Bretton - Sophomore; 24 - Sydnee Koosh - (redshirt) Junior; 55 - Jessica Walter - Graduate student; Catchers: 5 - Alexis Juhl - Freshman; 20 - Heidi Barber - Sophomore	Utility: 22 - Haley Coupal - Senior; 31 - Emma Willers - Freshman; Outfielders: 1 - Bella Cruz - Sophomore; 10 - Isabella Lundquist - Freshman; 11 - Kaitlyn Breslin - Junior; 12 - Kaitlyn Kibling - Senior; 21 - Bella Cefola - Freshman	Infielders: 3 - Kaiea Higa - Senior; 6 - Ava Calciano - Freshman; 7 - Grace Carrington - (redshirt) Sophomore; 8 - Cat Petteys - Sophomore; 15 - Savannah Ring - Senior; 19 - Caylee De Meo - Junior

=== Coaches ===
2026 Connecticut Huskies softball coaching staff
- Laura Valentino – Head coach – 7th season
- Mackenzie Keyes – Assistant coach – 3rd season
- Giselle Juarez-Presley – Assistant coach – 2nd season
- Sydney Fleming – Assistant coach – 1st season

== Schedule ==
Legend
	UConn win
	UConn loss
	Cancellation
**Bold**	UConn team member
*	Non-Conference game

2026 UConn Huskies softball game log
Regular season

February
Date	Opponent	Site/stadium	Score	Win	Loss	Save	Attendance	Overall record	BE Record
Feb 5	vs Samford*	JoAnne Graf Field at the Seminole Softball Complex • Tallahassee, FL (JoAnne Graf Classic)	**L** 2–6	Turner (1–0)	**Walter (0–1)**	None		0–1	
Feb 6	vs Marshall*	JoAnne Graf Field at the Seminole Softball Complex • Tallahassee, FL (JoAnne Graf Classic)	**L** 1–10	Maynard (1–0)	**Bohmer (0–1)**	Veal (1)		0–2	
Feb 7	vs Iowa*	JoAnne Graf Field at the Seminole Softball Complex • Tallahassee, FL (JoAnne Graf Classic)	**L** 9–10	Neiss (2–0)	**Watler (0–2)**	None		0–3	
Feb 8	at No. 7 Florida State*	JoAnne Graf Field at the Seminole Softball Complex • Tallahassee, FL (JoAnne Graf Classic)	**L** 0–6	Gaskell (1–0)	**Bacher (0–1)**	None	476	0–4	
Feb 13	vs Akron*	CSU Softball Complex • North Charleston, SC (Lowcountry Classic)	**W** 7–2	**Bohmer (1–1)**	Ma. Lee (0–1)	None		1–4	
Feb 13	at Charleston Southern*	CSU Softball Complex • North Charleston, SC (Lowcountry Classic)	**W** 13–0	**Walter (1–2)**	Clopton (0–4)	None	155	2–4	
Feb 14	vs Akron*	CSU Softball Complex • North Charleston, SC (Lowcountry Classic)	**L** 0–2	Jamrong (1–0)	**Koosh (0–1)**	None		2–5	
Feb 14	at College of Charleston*	CofC Softball Stadium at Patriots Point • Mount Pleasant, SC (Lowcountry Classic)	**L** 1–12	Mathis	**Bohmer (1–2)**	None	257	2–6	
Feb 15	vs Western Carolina*	CSU Softball Complex • North Charleston, SC (Lowcountry Classic)	**L** 1–2 ^{(8)}	Fulton	**Bohmer (1–3)**	None	162	2–7	
Feb 20	vs Wisconsin*	FGCU Softball Complex • Fort Myers, FL (Gulf Coast Classic)	**L** 0–3	Jacobson	**Walter (1–3)**	None		2–8	
Feb 20	vs Buffalo*	FGCU Softball Complex • Fort Myers, FL (Gulf Coast Classic)	**L** 3–6	Russ (2–3)	**Koosh (0–2)**	None		2–9	
Feb 21	vs Louisville*	FGCU Softball Complex • Fort Myers, FL (Gulf Coast Classic)	**L** 2–10 ^{(5)}	Reeves (2–0)	**Bohmer (1–5)**	None	505	2–10	
Feb 21	at Florida Gulf Coast*	FGCU Softball Complex • Fort Myers, FL (Gulf Coast Classic)	**W** 4–3	**Walter (2–2)**	Bacoulis (2–4)	**Bohmer (1)**	503	3–10	
Feb 22	vs Wisconsin*	FGCU Softball Complex • Fort Myers, FL (Gulf Coast Classic)	**L** 0–8 ^{(6)}	Herr (5–3)	**Walter (2–3)**	None	246	3–11	
Feb 27	vs Marshall*	Kamphuis Field at Liberty Softball Stadium • Lynchburg, VA (Liberty Invitational)	**L** 4–5	Veal (2–2)	**Bacher (0–2)**	None	67	3–12	
Feb 27	vs Marshall*	Kamphuis Field at Liberty Softball Stadium • Lynchburg, VA (Liberty Invitational)	**L** 1–3	Maynard (4–2)	**Bohmer (1–6)**	None	59	3–13	
Feb 28	at Liberty*	Kamphuis Field at Liberty Softball Stadium • Lynchburg, VA (Liberty Invitational)	**W** 7–1	**Walter (3–3)**	Yoder (0–3)	None	447	4–13	
Feb 28	vs Radford*	Kamphuis Field at Liberty Softball Stadium • Lynchburg, VA (Liberty Invitational)	**L** 2–5	Redmon (3–4)	**Koosh (0–3)**	None	67	4–14	

March
Date	Opponent	Site/stadium	Score	Win	Loss	Save	Attendance	Overall record	BE Record
Mar 1	vs Radford*	Kamphuis Field at Liberty Softball Stadium • Lynchburg, VA (Liberty Invitational)	**L** 1–5	Cooper (2–4)	**Walter (3–4)**	None	87	4–15	
Mar 8	at St. John's	Columbia Softball Stadium • New York, NY (Note: Due to field conditions, the series against St. John's was moved to Columbia's facilities in New York, with a doubleheader on Sunday and the finale on Monday.)	**W** 5–3	**Bohmer (2–5)**	Serafinko (7–4)	**Walter (1)**	75	5–15	1–0
Mar 8	at St. John's	Columbia Softball Stadium • New York, NY	**L** 10–11	Serafinko (8–4)	**Walter (3–5)**	None	75	5–16	1–1
Mar 9	at St. John's	Columbia Softball Stadium • New York, NY	**W** 4–1	**Bretton (3–6)**	Serafinko (8–5)	**Walter (1)**	25	6–16	2–1
Mar 10	Stonehill*	Connecticut Softball Stadium • Storrs, CT	**W** 7–3	**Koosh (1–3)**	Sciaretto (0–2)	None	215	7–16	
Mar 13	at Seton Hall	Mike Sheppard, Sr. Field • South Orange, NJ	**L** 4–5	Dupuis (2–0)	**Walter (3–6)**	None	42	7–17	2–2
Mar 14	at Seton Hall	Mike Sheppard, Sr. Field • South Orange, NJ	**W** 8–6	**Bretton (4–6)**	Kreuscher	**Walter (2)**	51	8–17	3–2
Mar 15	at Seton Hall	Mike Sheppard, Sr. Field • South Orange, NJ	**L** 5–8	Dupuis (3–0)	**Bacher (0–3)**	None	112	8–18	3–3
Mar 20	at No. 10 Arkansas*	Bogle Park • Fayetteville, AR	**L** 4–12 ^{(6)}	McWhorter (2–0)	**Walter (3–7)**	None	2,530	8–19	
Mar 21	at No. 10 Arkansas*	Bogle Park • Fayetteville, AR	**L** 2–10 ^{(6)}	Burnham (7–2)	**Koosh (1–4)**	None	3,088	8–20	
Mar 22	at No. 10 Arkansas*	Bogle Park • Fayetteville, AR	**L** 4–9	Timmerman (5–0)	**Walter (3–8)**	None	2,468	8–21	
Mar 24	New Haven*	Connecticut Softball Stadium • Storrs, CT	**W** 17–0 ^{(5)}	**Bohmer** (3–6)	Sullivan (2–2)	None	50	9–21	
Mar 24	New Haven*	Connecticut Softball Stadium • Storrs, CT	**W** 15–8	**Bacher** (1–3)	Rhodes (1–2)	None	133	10–21	
Mar 25	Boston University*	BU Softball Field • Boston, MA	**L** 1–9 ^{(6)}	Ricard (16–5)	**Koosh** (1–4)	None	57	10–22	
Mar 27	DePaul	Connecticut Softball Stadium • Storrs, CT	**W** 11–3 ^{(6)}	**Bohmer** (4–6)	Messer (6–10)	None	50	11–22	4–3
Mar 28	DePaul	Connecticut Softball Stadium • Storrs, CT	**W** 7–5	**Walter** (4–8)	Nigey (3–5)	**Bohmer** (2)	308	12–22	5–3
Mar 29	DePaul	Connecticut Softball Stadium • Storrs, CT	**W** 10–1	**Bohmer** (5–6)	Nigey (3–6)	None	332	13–22	6–3

April/May
Date	Opponent	Site/stadium	Score	Win	Loss	Save	Attendance	Overall record	BE Record
Apr 3	Villanova	Connecticut Softball Stadium • Storrs, CT	**W** 5–3	**Bohmer (6–6)**	Kobryn (2–10)	**Walter (4)**	275	14–22	7–3
Apr 3	Villanova	Connecticut Softball Stadium • Storrs, CT	**W** 9–1	**Koosh (2–5)**	King (1–4)	None	275 (DH)	15–22	8–3
Apr 4	Villanova	Connecticut Softball Stadium • Storrs, CT	**W** 2–0	**Bohmer (7–6)**	Zych (2–3)	**Walter (5)**	492	16–22	9–3
Apr 7	at Boston College*	Harrington Athletics Village • Brighton, MA	**W** 6–5	**Koosh (3–4)**	Colleran (3–8)	**Walter (6)**		17–22	
Apr 10	at Butler	Butler Softball Field • Indianapolis, IN	**W** 16–3 ^{(6)}	**Bohmer (8–6)**	Petran (7–5)	None	323	18–22	10–3
Apr 11	at Butler	Butler Softball Field • Indianapolis, IN	**W** 5–0	**Koosh (4–5)**	Dyer (3–3)	**Walter (7)**	407	19–22	11–3
Apr 12	at Butler	Butler Softball Field • Indianapolis, IN	**W** 2–1	**Bohmer (9–6)**	Berger (1–5)	**Walter (8)**	347	20–22	12–3
Apr 14	Bryant*	Connecticut Softball Stadium • Storrs, CT	**W** 6–0	**Bohmer (10–6)**	Tracy (2–8)	None	265	21–22	
Apr 17	Providence	Connecticut Softball Stadium • Storrs, CT	**L** 6–7	Twomey (9–1)	**Bohmer (10–7)**	Brooks (1)	343	21–23	12–4
Apr 18	Providence	Connecticut Softball Stadium • Storrs, CT	**L** 3–4 ^{(8)}	Frye (4–3)	**Bohmer (10–8)**	None	678	21–24	12–5
Apr 18	Providence	Connecticut Softball Stadium • Storrs, CT	**W** 12–4 ^{(6)}	**Koosh (5–5)**	Hopkins (1–4)	None	626	22–24	13–5
Apr 22	Hofstra*	Connecticut Softball Stadium • Storrs, CT	**W** 11–3 ^{(5)}	**Bohmer (11–8)**	Steppe (11–4)	None	51	23–24	
Apr 24	Creighton	Connecticut Softball Stadium • Storrs, CT	**W** 12–11	**Bretton (3–0)**	Harris (4–4)	**Walter (9)**	164	24–24	14–5
Apr 25	Creighton	Connecticut Softball Stadium • Storrs, CT	**L** 5–7	Gilman (14–8)	**Koosh (5–6)**	None	430	24–25	14–6
Apr 26	Creighton	Connecticut Softball Stadium • Storrs, CT	**W** 4–2	**Walter (5–8)**	Harris (4–5)	None	521	25–25	15–6
May 1	at Georgetown	Washington Nationals Youth Academy • Washington, D.C.	**W** 14–6	**Bohmer (11–8)**	Larson (5–8)	None	111	26–25	16–6
May 2	at Georgetown	Washington Nationals Youth Academy • Washington, D.C.	**W** 4–0	**Koosh (6–6)**	Egbert (5–7)	**Bretton (1)**	219	27–25	17–6
May 3	at Georgetown	Washington Nationals Youth Academy • Washington, D.C.	**W** 15–1 ^{(15)}	**Walter (6–8)**	Larson (7–10)	None	159	28–25	18–6

Post-Season

Big East Tournament
Date	Opponent	Seed	Site/stadium	Score	Win	Loss	Save	Attendance	Overall record	BET Record
May 7	(3) Creighton	(2)	Parkway Bank Sports Complex • Rosemont, IL	**W** 9–3	**Walter (7–8)**	Gilman (15–9)	None	563	29–25	1–0
May 8	(4) Butler	(2)	Parkway Bank Sports Complex • Rosemont, IL	**W** 12–1 ^{(6)}	**Bohmer (13–8)**	Dyer (4–5)	None		30–25	2–0
May 9	(3) Creighton	(2)	Parkway Bank Sports Complex • Rosemont, IL	**L** 2–5	Harris (7–6)	**Bohmer (13–9)**	None	257	30–26	2–1
May 9	(3) Creighton	(2)	Parkway Bank Sports Complex • Rosemont, IL	**W** 8–3	**Walter (8–8)**	Gilman (16–10)	None	257	31–26	3–1

NCAA College Station Regional
Date	Opponent	Seed	Site/stadium	Score	Win	Loss	Save	Attendance	Overall record	Reg Record
May 15	(1) Texas A&M	(4)	Davis Diamond • College Station, TX	**L** 3–17 ^{(5)}	Peters (15–5)	**Bohmer (13–10)**	None	1,752	31–27	0–1
May 16	(2) McNeese	(4)	Davis Diamond • College Station, TX	**W** 5–1	**Walter (9–8)**	Taylor (17–6)	None	1,644	32–27	1–1
May 16	(1) Texas A&M	(4)	Davis Diamond • College Station, TX	**L** 3–10	Lessentine (15–4)	**Koosh (6–7)**	None	1,656	32–28	1–2

Rankings from NFCA Poll, Tournament seeds in parentheses.
