= 2026 Big East Conference softball tournament =

- Teams: 4
- Format: Double-elimination tournament
- Finals site: Parkway Bank Sports Complex; Rosemont, Illinois
- Champions: UConn (9th title)
- Winning coach: Laura Valentino (2nd title)
- MVP: Jessica Walter (UConn)
- Television: ESPN+

2026 Big East Conference softball standings
	Conf.				Overall
Team	W		L	PCT	W		L	PCT
Providence ‍†‍‍	18	–	6	.750	29	–	20	.592
UConn ‍†‍‡‍^{y}	18	–	6	.750	31	–	26	.544
Creighton ‍‍‍	17	–	7	.708	32	–	27	.542
Butler ‍‍‍	15	–	9	.625	25	–	21	.543
St. John's ‍‍‍	9	–	15	.375	32	–	23	.582
Georgetown ‍‍‍	9	–	15	.375	16	–	26	.381
DePaul ‍‍‍	8	–	16	.333	20	–	30	.400
Villanova ‍‍‍	8	–	16	.333	14	–	39	.264
Seton Hall ‍‍‍	6	–	18	.250	19	–	30	.388
† – Conference champion ‡ – Tournament champion y – Invited to the NCAA Tournament; As of May 10, 2026; Rankings from NFCA/USA Today

The 2026 Big East Conference softball tournament was held at Parkway Bank Sports Complex in Rosemont, Illinois. The tournament ran from May 7 through May 9, 2026 and determined the champion for the Big East Conference for the 2026 NCAA Division I softball season. UConn won their second consecutive, and ninth overall, tournament championship to earn the Big East Conference's automatic bid to the 2026 NCAA Division I softball tournament. All games were broadcast on ESPN+.

== Format and seeding ==
The top four teams from the conference's round-robin regular season will qualify for the tournament, and will be seeded one through four. They will play a double-elimination tournament. Providence claimed the top seed by tiebreaker over UConn, having won the season series.

Team	W	L	Pct.	GB	Seed
Providence	18	6	.750	—	1
UConn	18	6	.750	—	2
Creighton	17	7	.708	1	3
Butler	15	9	.625	3	4
St. John's	9	15	.375	9	—
Georgetown	9	15	.375	9	—
DePaul	8	16	.333	10	—
Villanova	8	16	.333	10	—
Seton Hall	6	18	.250	12	—

== Tournament ==
=== Bracket ===
Upper round 1
1	Providence	3
4	Butler	10
3	Creighton	3
2	UConn	9
Lower round 1
1	Providence	2
3	Creighton	4

Upper final
4	Butler	1
2	UConn	12 ^{(6)}
Lower final
3	Creighton	9 ^{(6)}
4	Butler	0

Final
2	UConn	2	8
3	Creighton	3	5

=== Game results ===
Date	Game	Winner	Score	Loser	Notes
May 7	Game 1	(4) Butler	10–3	(1) Providence	
May 7	Game 2	(2) UConn	9–3	(3) Creighton	
May 7	Game 3	(3) Creighton	4–2	(1) Providence	Providence eliminated
May 8	Game 4	(2) UConn	12–1 ^{(6)}	(4) Butler	
May 8	Game 5	(3) Creighton	9–0 ^{(6)}	(4) Butler	Butler eliminated
May 9	Game 6	(3) Creighton	5–2		
May 9	Game 7	(2) UConn	8–3	(3) Creighton	UConn wins Big East Tournament

== All-Tournament Team ==
The following players were named to the All-Tournament Team.

Pos	Name	Class	School
P	Maren Berger	RS-So.	Butler
P	Landrie Harris	So.	Creighton
P	Jessica Walter	Gr.	UConn
INF	Julia Renny	Sr.	Providence
1B	Emma Willers	Fr.	UConn
1B	Keegan Mayhue	Fr.	Creighton
SS	Cat Petteys	So.	UConn
OF	Kaitlyn Breslin	Jr	UConn
DP	Kaelan Schultz	Jr.	Creighton

=== Most Outstanding Player ===
Jessica Walter was named Tournament Most Outstanding Player. Walter was a graduate pitcher for UConn who recorded a 2.33 ERA and a pair of wins in the tournament, including a complete game in the final.
