= Big East Conference softball tournament =

- Conference softball championship
- Sport: Softball
- Conference: Big East Conference
- Number of teams: 6
- Format: Single-elimination tournament
- Current stadium: Parkway Bank Sports Complex
- Current location: Rosemont, Illinois
- Played: 1990–present
- Last contest: 2026
- Current champion: UConn
- Most championships: UConn (9)

Host stadiums
- The Ballpark at Rosemont (2014–17, 2022, 2026); Glay Field (2022); Connecticut Softball Stadium (1992–93, 1997, 1999, 2021, 2023); USF Softball Stadium (2013); Melissa Cook Stadium (2012); Ulmer Stadium (2008–11); Ivy Field (1998, 2005–07); SU Softball Stadium (2004); Moyer Field (2002–03); VU Softball Stadium (2001); Shea Softball Field (1990–91, 1996, 2000); Regal Field (1994–95)

Host locations
- Rosemont, IL (2014–17, 2022, 2026); Providence, RI (2022); Storrs, CT (1992–93, 1997, 1999, 2021, 2023); Tampa, FL (2013); Notre Dame, IN (1998, 2005–07, 2012); Louisville, KY (2008–11); Syracuse, NY (2004); Salem, VA (2002–03); Villanova, PA (2001); Chestnut Hill, MA (1990–91, 1996, 2000); Notre Dame, IN (1998); Jamaica, NY (1994–95)

The Big East Conference softball tournament (sometimes known simply as the Big East Tournament) is the conference championship tournament in college softball for the Big East Conference. The winner receives the conference's automatic bid to the NCAA Division I softball tournament.

== Tournament ==
The top four regular season finishers compete in the single-elimination tournament. Beginning with the tournament's inception in 1990, four teams competed in the tournament. From 2006 through 2013, the top eight teams qualified for the event. Beginning in 2014, after the conference split, the Big East reverted to the four-team tournament. After the COVID-19 pandemic and with the return of UConn to the conference, the tournament expanded again to a six-team event, with the top two seeds receiving a single bye.

== Champions ==
=== Year-by-year ===
Year	School	Venue	MVP
1990	Connecticut	Shea Softball Field • Chestnut Hill, MA	Sue Rybczyk, Connecticut
1991	Connecticut	Shea Softball Field • Chestnut Hill, MA	Janna Venice, Connecticut
1992	Connecticut	Connecticut Softball Stadium • Storrs, CT	Kim Mizesko, Connecticut
1993	Connecticut	Connecticut Softball Stadium • Storrs, CT	Janna Venice, Connecticut
1994	Providence	Regal Field • Jamaica, NY	Kim Robbins, Providence
1995	Connecticut	Regal Field • Jamaica, NY	Bridgett McCaffery, Connecticut
1996	Connecticut	Shea Softball Field • Chestnut Hill, MA	Bridgett McCaffery, Connecticut
1997	Boston College	Connecticut Softball Stadium • Storrs, CT	Mary Dietz, Boston College
1998	Boston College	Ivy Field • Notre Dame, IN	Chris Vicari, Boston College
1999	Notre Dame	Connecticut Softball Stadium • Storrs, CT	Jennifer Sharron, Notre Dame
2000	Notre Dame	Shea Softball Field • Chestnut Hill, MA	Melanie Alkire, Notre Dame
2001	Connecticut	VU Softball Stadium • Villanova, PA	Barb Cook, Connecticut
2002	Notre Dame	Moyer Field • Salem, VA	Andrea Loman, Notre Dame
2003	Notre Dame	Moyer Field • Salem, VA	Andrea Loman, Notre Dame
2004	Seton Hall	SU Softball Stadium • Syracuse, NY	Megan Meyer, Seton Hall
2005	Seton Hall	Ivy Field • Notre Dame, IN	Megan Meyer, Seton Hall
2006	Notre Dame	Ivy Field • Notre Dame, IN	Heather Booth, Notre Dame
2007	Louisville	Ivy Field • Notre Dame, IN	Kristen Wadwell, Louisville
2008	DePaul	Ulmer Stadium • Louisville, KY	Becca Heteniak, DePaul
2009	Notre Dame	Ulmer Stadium • Louisville, KY	Brittney Bargar, Notre Dame
2010	Syracuse	Ulmer Stadium • Louisville, KY	Jenna Caira, Syracuse
2011	Syracuse	Ulmer Stadium • Louisville, KY	Jenna Caira, Syracuse
2012	Louisville	Melissa Cook Stadium • Notre Dame, IN	Jordan Trimble, Louisville
2013	South Florida	USF Softball Stadium • Tampa, FL	Sara Nevins, South Florida
2014	DePaul	The Ballpark at Rosemont • Rosemont, IL	Kristen Verdun, DePaul
2015	St. John's	The Ballpark at Rosemont • Rosemont, IL	Krista Puga, St. John's
2016	Butler	The Ballpark at Rosemont • Rosemont, IL	Sarah Dixon, Butler
2017	DePaul	The Ballpark at Rosemont • Rosemont, IL	Dylan Christensen, DePaul
2018	DePaul	The Ballpark at Rosemont • Rosemont, IL	Megan Leyva, DePaul
2019	DePaul	The Ballpark at Rosemont • Rosemont, IL	Natalie Halvorson, DePaul
2020	Cancelled due to the coronavirus pandemic		
2021	Villanova	Connecticut Softball Stadium • Storrs, CT	Paige Rauch, Villanova
2022	Villanova	The Ballpark at Rosemont • Rosemont, IL	Paige Rauch, Villanova
2023	Seton Hall	Connecticut Softball Stadium • Storrs, CT	Shelby Smith, Seton Hall
2024	Villanova	Glay Field • Providence, RI	Caroline Pellicano, Villanova
2025	UConn	Villanova Softball Complex • Villanova, PA	Payton Kinney, Connecticut
2026	UConn	Parkway Bank Sports Complex • Rosemont, IL	Jessica Walter, Connecticut

=== By school ===
School	Championships	Years
UConn (Note: UConn played as part of the American Athletic Conference from 2014–2020.)	9	1990, 1991, 1992, 1993, 1995, 1996, 2001, 2025, 2026
Notre Dame	6	1999, 2000, 2002, 2003, 2006, 2009
DePaul	5	2008, 2014, 2017, 2018, 2019
Seton Hall	3	2004, 2005, 2023
Villanova	3	2021, 2022, 2024
Boston College	2	1997, 1998
Louisville	2	2007, 2012
Syracuse	2	2010, 2011
Butler	1	2016
Providence	1	1994
South Florida	1	2013
St. John's	1	2015

Italics indicate that the school no longer competes in Big East Conference softball.
