= 2025 UConn Huskies softball team =

American college softball season

2025 UConn Huskies softball

Big East tournament champion

NCAA Baton Rouge Regional, 0–2
- Conference: Big East Conference
- Record: 35–19 (18–6 Big East)
- Head coach: Laura Valentino (6th season)
- Home stadium: Connecticut Softball Stadium

2025 Big East Conference softball standings
	Conf.						Overall
Team	W		L		T	PCT	W		L		T	PCT
St. John's ‍†‍‍	19	–	5	–	0	.792	39	–	17	–	1	.693
UConn ‍‍‡‍^{y}	18	–	6	–	0	.750	35	–	19	–	0	.648
Villanova ‍‍‍	15	–	9	–	0	.625	27	–	26	–	1	.509
Creighton ‍‍‍	15	–	9	–	0	.625	30	–	25	–	0	.545
Butler ‍‍‍	14	–	10	–	0	.583	26	–	22	–	0	.542
Providence ‍‍‍	11	–	13	–	0	.458	25	–	31	–	0	.446
Seton Hall ‍‍‍	11	–	13	–	0	.458	29	–	23	–	0	.558
DePaul ‍‍‍	3	–	21	–	0	.125	16	–	32	–	0	.333
Georgetown ‍‍‍	2	–	22	–	0	.083	11	–	32	–	0	.256
† – Conference champion ‡ – Tournament champion y – Invited to the NCAA Tournament; As of May 17, 2025; Rankings from NFCA/USA Today

The 2025 UConn Huskies softball team represented the University of Connecticut in the 2025 NCAA Division I softball season. The Huskies were led by Laura Valentino in her 6th year as head coach, and competed as part of the Big East Conference. They played their home games at Connecticut Softball Stadium.

The Huskies finished the regular season with an 18–6 record and entered the 2025 Big East Conference softball tournament as the second seed. They won the Big East tournament and advanced to the NCAA tournament for the first time since 2001. They lost to Nebraska and host LSU to end their season.

== Previous season ==
UConn finished with a final record of 31–24, and finished tied for second in the Big East with a conference record of 16–8. They reached the semifinals of the Big East tournament, but fell to Creighton.

== Personnel ==
=== Roster ===
2025 Connecticut Huskies roster
Pitchers: 00 - Payton Kinney - Graduate Student; 4 - Stella Kiemele - Freshman; 7 - Hope Jenkins - Junior; 23 - Amber Bretton - Freshman; 24 - Sydnee Koosh - (redshirt) Sophomore; Catchers: 5 - Sarah Blaskiewicz - Sophomore; 17 - Grace Jenkins - Junior; 20 - Heidi Barber - Freshman	Outfielders: 1 - Bella Cruz - Freshman; 11 - Kaitlyn Breslin - Sophomore; 12 - Kaitlyn Kibling - Junior; 14 - Lexi Hastings - Senior; 21 - Rayah Snyder - Sophomore; Utility: 22 - Haley Coupal - Junior	Infielders: 3 - Kaiea Higa - Junior; 8 - Cat Petteys - Freshman; 10 - Rosie Garcia - Senior; 15 - Savannah Ring - Junior; 19 - Caylee De Meo - Sophomore

=== Coaches ===
2025 Connecticut Huskies softball coaching staff
- Laura Valentino – Head coach – 6th season
- Mackenzie Keyes – Assistant coach – 2nd season
- Giselle Juarez – Assistant coach – 1st season
- Ashley Buschgans – Assistant coach – 1st season

== Schedule ==
Legend
	UConn win
	UConn loss
	Cancellation
**Bold**	UConn team member
*	Non-Conference game

2025 UConn Huskies softball game log
Regular season

February
Date	Opponent	Rank	Site/stadium	Score	Win	Loss	Save	Attendance	Overall record	BE Record
Feb 7	vs Ohio*		Hunt Softball Park • Elon, NC	**L** 14–18^{8}	Miller (2–0)	**Jenkins (0–1)**	None	145	0–1	
Feb 7	at Elon*		Hunt Softball Park • Elon, NC	**W** 8–2	**Koosh (1–0)**	McCard (0–1)	None	342	1–1	
Feb 8	vs UNC Greensboro*		Hunt Softball Park • Elon, NC	**L** 6–15	Byrd (1–2)	**Koosh (1–1)**	None	180	1–2	
Feb 9	vs Ohio State*		Hunt Softball Park • Elon, NC	**L** 1–3	Boutte (3–0)	**Koosh (1–2)**	None	136	1–3	
Feb 14	vs Middle Tennessee*		UNF Softball Complex • Jacksonville, FL	**W** 6–5^{8}	**Koosh (2–2)**	Ammon	None	100	2–3	
Feb 14	at North Florida*		UNF Softball Complex • Jacksonville, FL	**W** 5–4	**Koosh (3–2)**	Benning (2–2)	None	150	3–3	
Feb 15	vs Middle Tennessee*		Debbie and Fred Pruitt Softball Complex • Jacksonville, FL	**W** 4–3	**Jenkins (1–1)**	Coffman (0–3)	None	103	4–3	
Feb 15	at Jacksonville*		Debbie and Fred Pruitt Softball Complex • Jacksonville, FL	**L** 1–7	Waggoner (2–1)	**Koosh (3–3)**	None	166	4–4	
Feb 16	vs Cleveland State*		Debbie and Fred Pruitt Softball Complex • Jacksonville, FL	Canceled						
Feb 21	vs Jacksonville*		Sikes Field • Macon, GA	**W** 7–0	**Jenkins (2–1)**	Wells (1–1)	None	129	5–4	
Feb 21	vs Middle Tennessee State*		Sikes Field • Macon, GA	**W** 6–1	**Koosh (4–2)**	Martinez (0–2)	None	109	6–4	
Feb 22	vs Alabama State*		Sikes Field • Macon, GA	**W** 8–0^{6}	**Kiemele (1–1)**	Pouson (0–3)	None	115	7–4	
Feb 23	vs Alabama State*		Sikes Field • Macon, GA	**L** 10–8	Pouson (1–3)	**Bretton (0–1)**	None	163	7–5	
Feb 23	at Mercer*		Sikes Field • Macon, GA	**W** 2–1^{5}	**Kinney (1–0)**	Pitts (1–2)	**Koosh (1)**	219	8–5	
Feb 28	vs Wisconsin*		St. John Stadium – Charles Wade-John Lott Field • Conway, SC	**L** 1–5	Jacobson (4–1)	**Kinney (1–1)**	'None	212	8–6	
Feb 28	vs Bowling Green*		St. John Stadium – Charles Wade-John Lott Field • Conway, SC	**W** 8–7	**Jenkins (3–1)**	Marshall (1–2)	None	259	9–6	

March
Date	Opponent	Rank	Site/stadium	Score	Win	Loss	Save	Attendance	Overall record	BE Record
Mar 1	vs Bowling Green*		St. John Stadium – Charles Wade-John Lott Field • Conway, SC	**W** 4–0	**Jenkins (4–1)**	Marshall (1–3)	None	292	10–6	
Mar 1	at Coastal Carolina*		St. John Stadium – Charles Wade-John Lott Field • Conway, SC	**L** 6–7	Picone (7–1)	**Koosh (4–4)**	Metzger (1)	367	10–7	
Mar 2	at Coastal Carolina*		St. John Stadium – Charles Wade-John Lott Field • Conway, SC	**W** 4–1	**Kinney (2–1)**	Henderson (5–2)	**Bretton (1)**	290	11–7	
Mar 7	at Villanova		Villanova Softball Complex • Villanova, PA	**L** 2–10	Gallant (4–4)	**Kinney (2–2)**	None	223	11–8	0–1
Mar 8	at Villanova		Villanova Softball Complex • Villanova, PA	**W** 6–3	**Koosh (5–4)**	Kobryn (3–6)	None	289	12–8	1–1
Mar 9	at Villanova		Villanova Softball Complex • Villanova, PA	**W** 9–8	**Kinney (3–2)**	Kobryn (3–7)	None	264	13–8	2–1
Mar 14	at No. 7 Tennessee*		Sherri Parker Lee Stadium • Knoxville, TN	**L** 1–9	Pickens (8–3)	**Koosh (5–5)**	None	1,822	13–9	
Mar 14	at No. 7 Tennessee*		Sherri Parker Lee Stadium • Knoxville, TN	**L** 3–4	Pickens (9–3)	**Koosh (5–6)**	None	1,954	13–10	
Mar 16	at No. 7 Tennessee*		Sherri Parker Lee Stadium • Knoxville, TN	**L** 3–6	Mardjetko (8–1)	**Jenkins (4–2)**	None	2,014	13–11	
Mar 21	Seton Hall		Connecticut Softball Stadium • Storrs, CT	**W** 7–0	**Kinney (4–2)**	Carr (8–3)	None	244	14–11	3–1
Mar 22	Seton Hall		Connecticut Softball Stadium • Storrs, CT	**W** 6–2	**Jenkins (5–2)**	Kreuscher (4–4)	None	420	15–11	4–1
Mar 23	Seton Hall		Connecticut Softball Stadium • Storrs, CT	**W** 17–9	**Kinney (5–2)**	Kreuscher (4–5)	None	450	16–11	5–1
Mar 28	at Creighton		Creighton Sports Complex • Omaha, NE	**L** 6–7	Patchen (5–6)	**Koosh (5–7)**	None		16–12	5–2
Mar 28	at Creighton		Creighton Sports Complex • Omaha, NE	**W** 22–18	**Kiemele (2–0)**	Shifflett (6–5)	**Kinney (1)**	342	17–12	6–2
Mar 29	at Creighton		Creighton Sports Complex • Omaha, NE	**W** 8–0	**Kinney (6–2)**	Patchen (4–7)	None	111	18–12	7–2

April/May
Date	Opponent	Rank	Site/stadium	Score	Win	Loss	Save	Attendance	Overall record	BE Record
Apr 1	at Boston College*		Boston College Softball Field • Brighton, MA	**W** 7–0	**Koosh (6–7)**	Colleran (7–6)	None	95	19–12	
Apr 4	Butler		Connecticut Softball Stadium • Storrs, CT	**W** 10–9	**Kiemele (3–0)**	Baker (9–4)	None	413	20–12	8–2
Apr 4	Butler		Connecticut Softball Stadium • Storrs, CT	**L** 4–9	Baker (10–4)	**Koosh (6–8)**	None	433	20–13	8–3
Apr 6	Butler		Connecticut Softball Stadium • Storrs, CT	**W** 5–3	**Jenkins (6–2)**	Dyer (6–4)	**Kinney (2)**	482	21–13	9–3
Apr 9	UMass*		Connecticut Softball Stadium • Storrs, CT	**W** 10–4	**Jenkins (7–2)**	Bolton (5–7)	None	138	22–13	
Apr 11	at Providence		Glay Field • Providence, RI	**L** 1–4	Grifone (7–7)	**Kinney (6–3)**	None	152	22–14	9–4
Apr 11	at Providence		Glay Field • Providence, RI	**W** 17–6	**Jenkins (8–3)**	Twomey (3–9)	None	227	23–14	10–4
Apr 13	at Providence		Glay Field • Providence, RI	**W** 16–0	**Kinney (7–3)**	Grifone (7–8)	None	150	24–14	11–4
Apr 15	at Boston University*		Boston University Softball Field • Boston, MA	Canceled						
Apr 16	Fairfield*		Connecticut Softball Stadium • Storrs, CT	**W** 9–0^{5}	**Jenkins (9–2)**	Kovar (2–6)	None	297	25–14	
Apr 18	at DePaul		Cacciatore Stadium • Chicago, IL	**W** 16–1^{5}	**Kinney (8–3)**	Gusel (0–4)	None	134	26–14	12–4
Apr 18	at DePaul		Cacciatore Stadium • Chicago, IL	**W** 14–5	**Jenkins (10–2)**	Nigey (7–8)	None	87	27–14	13–4
Apr 19	at DePaul		Cacciatore Stadium • Chicago, IL	**W** 10–8^{8}	**Kinney (9–3)**	Nigey (7–9)	None	187	28–14	14–4
Apr 25	Georgetown		Connecticut Softball Stadium • Storrs, CT	**W** 2–1	**Jenkins (11–2)**	Wissmar (1–6)	None	237	29–14	15–4
Apr 26	Georgetown		Connecticut Softball Stadium • Storrs, CT	**W** 12–4^{5}	**Kinney (10–3)**	Dunn (5–15)	None	518	30–14	16–4
Apr 27	Georgetown		Connecticut Softball Stadium • Storrs, CT	**W** 12–3^{5}	**Kinney (11–3)**	Wissmar (1–7)	None	279	31–14	17–4
Apr 29	Boston College		Connecticut Softball Stadium • Storrs, CT	**L** 5–10	Colleran (13–13)	**Jenkins (11–3)**	None	271	31–15	
May 2	St. John's		Connecticut Softball Stadium • Storrs, CT	**W** 3–0	**Kinney (12–3)**	Serafinko (19–8)	None	428	32–15	18–4
May 3	St. John's		Connecticut Softball Stadium • Storrs, CT	**L** 3–4	Francia (18–6)	**Kinney (12–4)**	None	498	32–16	18–5
May 4	St. John's		Connecticut Softball Stadium • Storrs, CT	**L** 5–6^{8}	Francia (19–6)	**Kinney (12–5)**	None	518	32–17	18–6

Post-Season

Big East Tournament
Date	Opponent	Seed	Site/stadium	Score	Win	Loss	Save	Attendance	Overall record	BET Record
May 8	(6) Providence	(2)	Villanova Softball Complex • Villanova, PA	**W** 5–4	**Kinney (13–5)**	Twomey (4–13)	None		33–17	1–0
May 9	(4) Creighton	(2)	Villanova Softball Complex • Villanova, PA	**W** 12–1^{6}	**Kinney (14–5)**	Schopfer (9–7)	None		34–17	2–0
May 10	(4) Creighton	(2)	Villanova Softball Complex • Villanova, PA	**W** 18–4^{5}	**Kinney (15–5)**	Schopfer (10–8)	None		35–17	3–0

NCAA Baton Rouge Regional
Date	Opponent	Seed	Site/stadium	Score	Win	Loss	Save	Attendance	Overall record	NCAAT Record
May 16	No. 19 (2) Nebraska	(3)	Tiger Park • Baton Rouge, LA	**L** 2–10^{6}	Magee (8–4)	**Kinney (15–6)**	None	2,228	35–18	0–1
May 17	No. 11 (1) LSU	(3)	Tiger Park • Baton Rouge, LA	**L** 0–3	Berzon (18–7)	**Kinney (15–7)**	None	2,380	35–19	0–2

Rankings from NFCA Poll, Tournament seeds in parentheses.
