= List of UConn Huskies head softball coaches =

The UConn Huskies softball program is a college softball team that represents the University of Connecticut in the Big East Conference. The Huskies compete in the National Collegiate Athletic Association (NCAA) Division I. The current head coach is Laura Valentino, who coached her first season in 2020.

The first season of softball at UConn was in 1975. The team has had five recorded head coaches.

The Huskies have appeared in the Women's College World Series once, in 1993, when they finished tied for fifth with a 1–2 record.

Karen Mullins is the longest-tenured coach at 31 years and holds nearly all coaching records as a result.

== Key ==
General
#	Number of coaches (Note: A running total of the number of head coaches.)
GC	Games coached

Overall
OW	Wins
OL	Losses
OT	Ties
O%	Winning percentage

Conference (Note: The Huskies played in ECAC from 1975 until the Big East Conference began sponsoring softball in 1990. When that organization split, they joined the American Athletic Conference beginning with the 2014 season. They rejoined the Big East Conference beginning with the 2021 season.)
CW	Wins
CL	Losses
CT	Ties
C%	Winning percentage

Postseason (Note: Postseason play involving the NCAA Division I softball championship.)
PA	Total appearances (Note: Postseason appearances include seasons with NCAA Division I softball championship bids since the tournament began in 1982.)
PW	Total wins
PL	Total losses
WA	Women's College World Series appearances (Note: Women's College World Series appearances include seasons with WCWS bids since the tournament began in 1969.)
WW	Women's College World Series wins
WL	Women's College World Series losses

Championships
DC	Division regular season (Note: The Big East Conference used a divisional format for three seasons: 1996–1998. Regular season conference championships were not recognized in those seasons.)
CC	Conference regular season
CT	Conference tournament (Note: The Big East Conference softball tournament began in 1990.)

== Coaches ==
List of head Softball coaches showing season(s) coached, overall records, conference records, postseason records, championships and selected awards (Note: Statistics correct as of the end of the 2026 college softball season.)
#	Name	Term	GC	OW	OL	OT	O%	CW	CL	CT	C%	PA	PW	PL	WA	WW	WL	DCs	CCs	CTs	NCs	Awards
1	Linda Hanson	1976-1981	27	12	15	0	.444	—	—	—	—	—	—	—	—	—	—	—	—	—	0	—
2	Ruth Mead	1982–1983	53	31	22	0	.585	—	—	—	—	—	—	—	—	—	—	—	—	—	0	—
3	Karen Mullins	1984–2014	1493	862	626	5	.579	222	196	0	.531	8	9	15	1	1	2	2	6	7	0	Big East Coach of the Year: 1992, 1993, 1994, 1995, 1997
4	Jen McIntyre	2015–2019	207	74	133	0	.357	16	55	0	.225	—	—	—	—	—	—	—	—	—	0	—
5	Laura Valentino	2020–present	277	208	129	0	.617	103	38	0	.730	2	1	4	—	—	—	—	3	2	0	Big East Coaching Staff of the Year: 2022
