= 2021 UConn Huskies softball team =

American college softball season

2021 UConn Huskies softball
- Conference: Big East Conference
- Record: 22–20 (12–9 Big East)
- Head coach: Laura Valentino (2nd season)
- Home stadium: Connecticut Softball Stadium

2021 Big East Conference softball standings
	Conf.						Overall
Team	W		L		T	PCT	W		L		T	PCT
DePaul ‍†‍‍	13	–	1	–	0	.929	22	–	11	–	0	.667
Villanova ‍‍‡‍^{y}	15	–	2	–	0	.882	36	–	14	–	0	.720
UConn ‍‍‍	12	–	9	–	0	.571	22	–	20	–	0	.524
Creighton ‍‍‍	8	–	7	–	0	.533	14	–	14	–	0	.500
Butler ‍‍‍	6	–	11	–	1	.361	17	–	21	–	1	.449
St. John's ‍‍‍	7	–	14	–	0	.333	10	–	20	–	0	.333
Seton Hall ‍‍‍	5	–	13	–	0	.278	9	–	23	–	0	.281
Providence ‍‍‍	4	–	13	–	1	.250	5	–	16	–	1	.250
Georgetown ‍‍‍	0	–	0	–	0	–	0	–	0	–	0	–
‡ – Tournament champion As of May 21, 2021; Rankings from NFCA/USA Today

The 2021 UConn Huskies softball team represented the University of Connecticut in the 2021 NCAA Division I softball season. The Huskies were led by Laura Valentino in her 2nd year as head coach, and played as part of the Big East Conference after joining the conference for the 2020–21 academic year. They play their home games at the newly rebuilt Connecticut Softball Stadium. UConn finished with a final record of 22–20, and finished third in the Big East with a conference record of 12–9. They reached the final of the Big East Tournament, but fell to Villanova.

== Previous season ==
As with other teams, the Huskies' 2020 season was cut short by the COVID-19 pandemic during March. UConn was off to a promising start, with a 16–5 record, the first time the Huskies finished with a winning record since 2009. No conference games were played prior to the early cancellation of the season.

== Personnel ==
=== Roster ===
2021 Connecticut Huskies roster
Pitchers: 00 - Payton Kinney – Freshman; 16 - Meghan O'Neil – Sophomore; 17 - Marybeth Olson – Senior	Catchers: 4 - Lauren Benson – Freshman; 7 - Devon Casazza – Graduate Student; 22 - Madisyn Estorga – Freshman; Outfielders: 1 - Hollis Wivell – (redshirt) Junior; 5 - Aziah James – Junior; 19 - Reese Guevarra – Senior; 20 - Ashley Esty – Junior; 21 - Cali Jolley – Sophomore	Infielders: 3 - Taylor Zatyk – Freshman; 6 - Rileigh DeWeese – Freshman; 8 - Briana Marcelino – Senior; 9 - Olivia Sappington – (redshirt) Senior; 11 - Mackenzie Fitzpatrick – Sophomore; 15 - Sami Barnett – (redshirt) Junior; 23 - Jana Sanden – Freshman; 24 - Emily Piergustavo – Junior; 31 - Makenzie Mason – Freshman; 41 - Morgan Ash – Junior

=== Coaches ===
2021 connecticut huskies softball coaching staff
- Laura Valentino – Head coach – 2nd season
- Christie Novatin – Associate head coach – 2nd season
- Jessica Jacobson – Assistant coach – 2nd season
- Pattie Ruth Taylor – Volunteer assistant Coach – 2nd season

== Schedule ==
Legend
	UConn win
	UConn loss
	Cancellation
**Bold**	UConn team member
*	Non-Conference game

2021 UConn Huskies softball game log
Regular season

February
Date	Opponent	Site/stadium	Score	Win	Loss	Save	Attendance	Overall record	BE Record
Feb 12	vs Ohio*	St. John Stadium – Charles Wade-John Lott Field • Conway, SC (Kickin' Chicken Classic)	Cancelled						
Feb 12	vs Tennessee*	St. John Stadium – Charles Wade-John Lott Field • Conway, SC (Kickin' Chicken Classic)	Cancelled						
Feb 13	at Coastal Carolina*	St. John Stadium – Charles Wade-John Lott Field • Conway, SC (Kickin' Chicken Classic)	Cancelled						
Feb 14	vs Tennessee*	St. John Stadium – Charles Wade-John Lott Field • Conway, SC (Kickin' Chicken Classic)	Cancelled						
Feb 19	vs Northern Illinois*	FGCU Softball Complex • Fort Myers, FL (FGCU softball tournament)	**W** 7–1	**Kinney (1–0)**	Norred (0–1)	None		1–0	
Feb 19	vs FIU*	FGCU Softball Complex • Fort Myers, FL (FGCU softball tournament)	**W** 4–3^{9}	**O'Neil (1–0)**	Dunford (2–1)	None		2–0	
Feb 20	vs FIU*	FGCU Softball Complex • Fort Myers, FL (FGCU softball tournament)	**W** 3–1	**Kinney (2–0)**	Dunford (2–2)	None		3–0	
Feb 20	at Florida Gulf Coast	FGCU Softball Complex • Fort Myers, FL (FGCU softball tournament)	**L** 1–3	Mesiemore (1–3)	**O'Neil (1–1)**	None	178	3–1	
Feb 21	at Florida Gulf Coast*	FGCU Softball Complex • Fort Myers, FL (FGCU softball tournament)	**L** 4–5^{11}	Mesiemore (2–3)	**Kinney (2–1)**	None		3–2	
Feb 26	vs Ole Miss*	Getterman Stadium • Waco, TX	**L** 0–7	Bruce (1–0)	**Kinney (2–2)**	None		3–3	
Feb 26	at No. 23 Baylor*	Getterman Stadium • Waco, TX	**L** 0–5	Mansell (1–0)	**O'Neil (1–2)**	None	300	3–4	
Feb 27	vs Lamar*	Getterman Stadium • Waco, TX	**W** 7–0	**O'Neil (2–2**	Ruiz (1–2)	None	100	4–4	
Feb 27	at No. 23 Baylor*	Getterman Stadium • Waco, TX	**W** 7–3	**Kinney (3–2)**	Rodoni (1–2)	None	300	5–4	
Feb 28	at No. 7 Texas*	Red and Charline McCombs Field • Austin, TX	**L** 2–16^{5}	White (2–0)	**Kinney (3–3)**	None	376	5–5	

March
Date	Opponent	Site/stadium	Score	Win	Loss	Save	Attendance	Overall record	BE Record
Mar 5	vs Elon*	Williams Field at Anderson Stadium • Chapel Hill, NC (UNC Tournament)	**W** 7–3	**O'Neil (3–2)**	Nemeth (0–2)	None	40	6–5	
Mar 5	at North Carolina*	Williams Field at Anderson Stadium • Chapel Hill, NC (UNC Tournament)	**L** 1–3^{8}	Pickett (5–2)	**Kinney (3–4)**	None	80	6–6	
Mar 6	vs No. 17 South Carolina*	Williams Field at Anderson Stadium • Chapel Hill, NC (UNC Tournament)	**L** 6–7^{8}	Betenbaugh (4–0)	**Kinney (3–5)**	None	40	6–7	
Mar 7	vs Elon*	Williams Field at Anderson Stadium • Chapel Hill, NC (UNC Tournament)	**L** 0–1^{8}	Quinn (3–3)	**Kinney (3–6)**	None	40	6–8	
Mar 7	at No. 14 Duke*	Duke Softball Stadium • Durham, NC	**L** 0–7	St. George (7–0)	**Kinney (3–7)**	None		6–9	
Mar 13	Georgetown	Connecticut Softball Stadium • Storrs, CT	Cancelled						
Mar 13	Georgetown	Connecticut Softball Stadium • Storrs, CT	Cancelled						
Mar 14	Georgetown	Connecticut Softball Stadium • Storrs, CT	Cancelled						
Mar 17	at Rhode Island*	URI Softball Complex • Kingston, RI	**W** 10–7	**O'Neil (4–2)**	Lynchard (0–4)	None		7–9	
Mar 20	at Creighton	Creighton Sports Complex • Omaha, NE	**L** 1–2	Boyd (5–4)	**Kinney (3–8)**	None		7–10	0–1
Mar 20	at Creighton	Creighton Sports Complex • Omaha, NE	**W** 9–1	**O'Neil (5–2)**	Santa Cruz (2–2)	None	143	8–10	1–1
Mar 21	at Creighton	Creighton Sports Complex • Omaha, NE	**W** 10–5	**Kinney (4–8)**	Boyd (5–5)	None	102	9–10	2–1
Mar 24	Central Connecticut*	Connecticut Softball Stadium • Storrs, CT	**W** 10–2^{5}	**Kinney (5–8)**	Houghton (1–1)	None	81	10–10	
Mar 27	Butler	Connecticut Softball Stadium • Storrs, CT	**W** 6–1	**Kinney (6–8)**	Ricketts (6–5)	None	81	11–10	3–1
Mar 27	Butler	Connecticut Softball Stadium • Storrs, CT	**W** 4–2	**Kinney (7–8)**	Graves (3–4)	None	81	12–10	4–1
Mar 28	Butler	Connecticut Softball Stadium • Storrs, CT	**W** 1–0^{5}	**Kinney (8–8)**	Griman (0–2)	None	60	13–10	5–1

April
Date	Opponent	Site/stadium	Score	Win	Loss	Save	Attendance	Overall record	BE Record
Apr 2	at DePaul	Cacciatore Stadium • Chicago, IL	**L** 1–5	Halvorson (4–3)	**Kinney (8–9)**	None	50	13–11	5–2
Apr 2	at DePaul	Cacciatore Stadium • Chicago, IL	**L** 5–6	Gomez (2–0)	**O'Neil (5–3)**	None	50	13–12	5–3
Apr 3	at DePaul	Cacciatore Stadium • Chicago, IL	**L** 2–4	Dalgarn (8–1)	**Kinney (8–10)**	None	35	13–13	5–4
Apr 10	at Providence	Glay Field • Providence, RI	Postponed due to COVID-19 protocols						
Apr 10	at Providence	Glay Field • Providence, RI	Postponed due to COVID-19 protocols						
Apr 11	at Providence	Glay Field • Providence, RI	Postponed due to COVID-19 protocols						
Apr 13	UMass*	Connecticut Softball Stadium • Storrs, CT	Postponed due to COVID-19 protocols						
Apr 14	at Fordham*	Bahoshy Softball Complex/Murphy Field • Bronx, NY	Postponed due to COVID-19 protocols						
Apr 21	Seton Hall	Connecticut Softball Stadium • Storrs, CT	Postponed due to COVID-19 protocols						
Apr 21	Seton Hall	Connecticut Softball Stadium • Storrs, CT	Postponed due to COVID-19 protocols						
Apr 22	Seton Hall	Connecticut Softball Stadium • Storrs, CT	Postponed due to COVID-19 protocols						
Apr 27	at Providence	Glay Field • Providence, RI	**W** 6–4	**O'Neil (6–3)**	Grifone (1–5)	None	50	14–13	6–4
Apr 27	at Providence	Glay Field • Providence, RI	**W** 8–5	**Olson (1–0)**	Murphy (0–1)	None	50	15–13	7–4
Apr 28	at Providence	Glay Field • Providence, RI	**W** 4–1	**O'Neil (7–3)**	Alvarez (2–6)	None	60	16–13	8–4

May
Date	Opponent	Site/stadium	Score	Win	Loss	Save	Attendance	Overall record	BE Record
May 1	St. John's	Connecticut Softball Stadium • Storrs, CT	**W** 4–3	**O'Neil (8–3)**	Brown (4–8)	None	113	17–13	9–4
May 1	St. John's	Connecticut Softball Stadium • Storrs, CT	**W** 9–1^{5}	**O'Neil (9–3)**	Saric (1–5)	None	113	18–13	10–4
May 2	St. John's	Connecticut Softball Stadium • Storrs, CT	**L** 2–6	Kmett (5–5)	**Kinney (8–11)**	Brown (2)	113	18–14	10–5
May 5	Seton Hall	Connecticut Softball Stadium • Storrs, CT	**W** 3–1	**O'Neil (10–3)**	Smith (2–9)	**Kinney (1)**		19–14	11–5
May 6	Seton Hall	Connecticut Softball Stadium • Storrs, CT	**L** 1–2	Carr (4–8)	**Olson (1–1)**	None	77	19–15	11–6
May 6	Seton Hall	Connecticut Softball Stadium • Storrs, CT	**W** 6–2	**Kinney (9–11)**	Smith (2–10)	**O'Neil (1)**	77	20–15	12–6
May 8	at Villanova	Villanova Softball Complex • Villanova, PA	**L** 0–1	Rauch (17–3)	**O'Neil (10–4)**	None	40	20–16	12–7
May 8	at Villanova	Villanova Softball Complex • Villanova, PA	**L** 6–7	Kennedy (6–3)	**O'Neil (10–5)**	None	40	20–17	12–8
May 9	at Villanova	Villanova Softball Complex • Villanova, PA	**L** 7–9	Pellicano (3–1)	**O'Neil (10–6)**	None	40	20–18	12–9

Post-Season

Big East Tournament
Date	Opponent	Seed	Site/stadium	Score	Win	Loss	Save	Attendance	Overall record	BET Record
May 13	(2) Villanova	(3)	Connecticut Softball Stadium • Storrs, CT	**W** 4–3	**Kinney (10–11)**	Kennedy (6–4)	**O'Neil (2)**	113	21–18	1–0
May 14	(4) Butler	(3)	Connecticut Softball Stadium • Storrs, CT	**W** 4–1	**Kinney (11–11)**	Graves (6–5)	None	113	22–18	2–0
May 15	(2) Villanova	(3)	Connecticut Softball Stadium • Storrs, CT	**L** 1–5	Rauch (20–3)	**Olson (1–2)**	None	113	22–19	2–1
May 15	(2) Villanova	(3)	Connecticut Softball Stadium • Storrs, CT	**L** 1–6	Amarillas (7–3)	**O'Neil (10–7)**	None	113	22–20	2–2

Rankings from NFCA Poll, Tournament seeds in parentheses.
