= 2016 Big East Conference softball tournament =

- Teams: 4
- Format: Single-elimination tournament
- Finals site: The Ballpark at Rosemont; Rosemont, Illinois
- Champions: Butler (1st title)
- Winning coach: Scott Hall (1st title)
- MVP: Sarah Dixon (Butler)
- Television: FS2

2016 Big East Conference softball standings
	Conf.				Overall
Team	W		L	PCT	W		L	PCT
DePaul ‍†‍‍	16	–	3	.842	27	–	25	.519
Villanova ‍‍‍	14	–	6	.700	32	–	18	.640
St. John's ‍‍‍	12	–	7	.632	29	–	20	.592
Butler ‍‍‡‍^{y}	9	–	7	.563	28	–	24	.538
Creighton ‍‍‍	7	–	11	.389	25	–	22	.532
Seton Hall ‍‍‍	7	–	12	.368	24	–	30	.444
Providence ‍‍‍	6	–	14	.300	21	–	28	.429
Georgetown ‍‍‍	3	–	14	.176	9	–	35	.205
† – Conference champion ‡ – Tournament champion y – Invited to the NCAA tournament As of June 30, 2016; Rankings from NFCA

The 2016 Big East Conference softball tournament was held at The Ballpark at Rosemont in Rosemont, Illinois. The tournament, hosted by DePaul University, ran May 13 through May 14, 2016 and determined the champion for the Big East Conference for the 2016 NCAA Division I softball season. Fourth-seeded Butler won the tournament for the first time and earned the Big East Conference's automatic bid to the 2016 NCAA Division I softball tournament. The entire tournament aired on Fox Sports 2. Dave Bernhard and Bob Brainerd served as the broadcasters for Fox.

== Format and seeding ==
The top four teams from the conference's round-robin regular season qualified for the tournament, and were seeded one through four. They played a single-elimination tournament.

Team	W	L	Pct.	GB	Seed
DePaul	16	3	.842	—	1
Villanova	14	6	.700	2.5	2
St. John's	12	7	.632	4	3
Butler	9	7	.536	5.5	4
Creighton	7	11	.389	8.5	—
Seton Hall	7	12	.368	9	—
Providence	6	14	.300	10.5	—
Georgetown	3	14	.176	12	—

== Tournament ==
Semifinals
1	DePaul	6
4	Butler	10
2	Villanova	0
3	St. John's	10^{(5)}

Championship
4	Butler	10^{(8)}
3	St. John's	8

== All-Tournament Team ==
The following players were named to the All-Tournament Team.

Pos	Player	School	Class
P	Kristin Gutierrez	Butler	Senior
P	McKenzie Murray	St. John’s	Sophomore
C	Riley Carter	Butler	Senior
C	Naomi Tellez	DePaul	Senior
1B	Dylan Christensen	DePaul	Junior
1B	Kaitlin Doud	Butler	Freshman
3B	Christina Melendez	St. John’s	Freshman
RF	Yvonne Rericha	St. John’s	Senior
RF	Sarah Dixon	Butler	Sophomore

=== Most Outstanding Player ===
Sarah Dixon was named Tournament Most Outstanding Player. Dixon was an outfielder for Butler.
