= 2024 Big East Conference softball tournament =

- Teams: 6
- Format: Double-elimination tournament
- Finals site: Glay Field; Providence, Rhode Island
- Champions: Villanova (3rd title)
- Winning coach: Bridget Orchard (3rd title)
- MVP: Caroline Pellicano (Villanova)
- Television: FS2

2024 Big East Conference softball standings
	Conf.						Overall
Team	W		L		T	PCT	W		L		T	PCT
Villanova ‍†‍‡‍^{y}	19	–	5	–	0	.792	33	–	24	–	0	.579
Creighton ‍‍‍	16	–	8	–	0	.667	36	–	21	–	0	.632
UConn ‍‍‍	16	–	8	–	0	.667	31	–	24	–	0	.564
Seton Hall ‍‍‍	14	–	10	–	0	.583	27	–	23	–	0	.540
St. John's ‍‍‍	13	–	11	–	0	.542	31	–	27	–	0	.534
Providence ‍‍‍	11	–	13	–	0	.458	22	–	23	–	1	.489
Butler ‍‍‍	11	–	13	–	0	.458	23	–	29	–	0	.442
Georgetown ‍‍‍	4	–	20	–	0	.167	14	–	33	–	0	.298
DePaul ‍‍‍	4	–	20	–	0	.167	9	–	38	–	0	.191
† – Conference champion ‡ – Tournament champion y – Invited to the NCAA Tournament; As of May 19, 2024; Rankings from NFCA/USA Today

The 2024 Big East Conference softball tournament was held at Glay Field on the campus of the Providence College in Providence, Rhode Island. The tournament ran May 8 through May 11, 2024 and determined the champion for the Big East Conference for the 2024 NCAA Division I softball season. Villanova won the event to earn the Big East Conference's automatic bid to the 2024 NCAA Division I softball tournament. The semifinals and finals were broadcast on Fox Sports 2.

== Format and seeding ==
The top six teams from the conference's round-robin regular season will qualify for the tournament, and will be seeded one through six. They will play a double-elimination tournament.

Team	W	L	Pct.	GB	Seed
Villanova	19	5	.792	—	1
UConn	16	8	.667	3	2
Creighton	16	8	.667	3	3
Seton Hall	14	10	.583	5	4
St. John's	13	11	.542	6	5
Butler	11	13	.458	8	6
Providence	11	13	.458	8	—
Georgetown	4	20	.167	15	—
DePaul	4	20	.167	15	—

== Tournament ==
Upper round 1	Upper round 2	Upper final	Final
1	Villanova	5^{8}
4	Seton Hall	2	5	St. John's	4
5	St. John's	5	1	Villanova	4
2	UConn	1
2	UConn	3
3	Creighton	4	3	Creighton	1
6	Butler	2
1	Villanova	4
3	Creighton	1
Lower round 1	Lower round 2	Lower round 3	Lower final
2	UConn	6
3	Creighton	2	3	Creighton	10
5	St. John's	12^{5}	5	St. John's	1
4	Seton Hall	0	6	Butler	2
6	Butler	9^{5}

=== Game results ===
Date	Game	Winner	Score	Loser	Notes
May 8	Game 1	(5) St. John's	5–2	(4) Seton Hall	
May 8	Game 2	(3) Creighton	4–2	(6) Butler	
May 9	Game 3	(6) Butler	9–0 ^{5}	(4) Seton Hall	Seton Hall eliminated
May 9	Game 4	(1) Villanova	5–4 ^{8}	(5) St. John's	
May 9	Game 5	(2) UConn	3–1	(3) Creighton	
May 9	Game 6	(5) St. John's	12–2 ^{5}	(6) Butler	Butler eliminated
May 10	Game 7	(1) Villanova	4–1	(2) UConn	
May 10	Game 8	(3) Creighton	2–1	(5) St. John's	St. John's eliminated
May 10	Game 9	(3) Creighton	10–6	(2) UConn	UConn eliminated
May 11	Game 10	(1) Villanova	4–1	(3) Creighton	Villanova wins Big East Championship

== All-Tournament Team ==
The following players were named to the All-Tournament Team.

Player	Class	Position	School
Caroline Pellicano	Sr.	P	Villanova*
Ally Jones	Gr.	C	Villanova
Alyssa Seidler	Sr.	P	Villanova
Kelsey White	Jr.	P/OF	Villanova
Natalia Puchino	So.	P	Creighton
Sydra Seville	Jr.	OF	Creighton
Cate Lehner	So.	OF	Butler
Hope Jenkins	So.	P	UConn
Sydney Totarsky	So.	OF	St. John's

=== Most Outstanding Player ===
Caroline Pellicano was named Tournament Most Outstanding Player. Pellicano was a pitcher for Villanova.
