= 2021 Big East Conference softball tournament =

- Teams: 4
- Format: Double-elimination tournament
- Finals site: Connecticut Softball Stadium; Storrs, Connecticut
- Champions: Villanova (1st title)
- Winning coach: Bridget Orchard (1st title)
- MVP: Paige Rauch (Villanova)
- Television: FS2

2021 Big East Conference softball standings
	Conf.						Overall
Team	W		L		T	PCT	W		L		T	PCT
DePaul ‍†‍‍	13	–	1	–	0	.929	22	–	11	–	0	.667
Villanova ‍‍‡‍^{y}	15	–	2	–	0	.882	36	–	14	–	0	.720
UConn ‍‍‍	12	–	9	–	0	.571	22	–	20	–	0	.524
Creighton ‍‍‍	8	–	7	–	0	.533	14	–	14	–	0	.500
Butler ‍‍‍	6	–	11	–	1	.361	17	–	21	–	1	.449
St. John's ‍‍‍	7	–	14	–	0	.333	10	–	20	–	0	.333
Seton Hall ‍‍‍	5	–	13	–	0	.278	9	–	23	–	0	.281
Providence ‍‍‍	4	–	13	–	1	.250	5	–	16	–	1	.250
Georgetown ‍‍‍	0	–	0	–	0	–	0	–	0	–	0	–
‡ – Tournament champion As of May 21, 2021; Rankings from NFCA/USA Today

The 2021 Big East Conference softball tournament was held at Connecticut Softball Stadium on the campus of the University of Connecticut in Storrs, Connecticut. The tournament was held from May 13 through May 15, 2021 and determined the champion for the Big East Conference for the 2021 NCAA Division I softball season. As the tournament champion, Villanova earned the Big East Conference's automatic bid to the 2021 NCAA Division I softball tournament. The semifinals and finals were broadcast on Fox Sports 2.

== Format and seeding ==
The top four teams from the conference's round-robin regular season qualified for the tournament, and were seeded one through four. They played a double-elimination tournament. Due to COVID-19 protocols, Creighton was unable to participate in the Tournament, resulting in Butler claiming the fourth seed.

Team	W	L	T	Pct.	GB	Seed
DePaul	13	1	0	.929	—	1
Villanova	15	2	0	.882	1.5	2
UConn	12	9	0	.571	5	3
Creighton	8	7	0	.533	5.5	—
Butler	6	11	1	.361	8.5	4
St. John's	7	14	0	.333	9.5	—
Seton Hall	5	13	0	.278	10	—
Providence	4	13	1	.250	10.5	—
Georgetown	0	0	0	.000	—	—

== Tournament ==
=== Bracket ===
First Round
1	DePaul	1
4	Butler	8
3	UConn	4
2	Villanova	3
Lower round 1
1	DePaul	1
2	Villanova	9

Semi-Finals
4	Butler	1
3	UConn	4
Lower final
4	Butler	5
2	Villanova	14

Finals
3	UConn	1	1
2	Villanova	5	6

=== Game results ===
Date	Game	Winner	Score	Loser	Notes
May 13	Game 1	(4) Butler	8–1	(1) DePaul	
May 13	Game 2	(3) UConn	4–3	(2) Villanova	
May 13	Game 3	(2) Villanova	9–1	(1) DePaul	DePaul eliminated
May 14	Game 4	(3) UConn	4–1	(4) Butler	
May 14	Game 5	(2) Villanova	14–5	(4) Butler	Butler eliminated
May 15	Game 6	(2) Villanova	5-1	(3) UConn	
May 15	Game 7	(2) Villanova	6-1	(3) UConn	UConn eliminated
