= Karen Mullins =

American college softball coach

Playing career

Basketball
- 1975–1979: Connecticut

Softball
- 1978–1979: Connecticut

Coaching career (HC unless noted)
- 1980–1981: Nichols
- 1984–2014: Connecticut

Head coaching record
- Overall: 872–636–5

Accomplishments and honors

Awards
- 3× NFCA Northeast Coach of the Year (1989, 1990, 1993); 5× Big East Coach of the Year (1992–1995, 1997)

Karen Mullins is an American college softball coach, most recently the long-time head coach of the Connecticut Huskies softball team. She served in that role from 1984 to 2014. She announced her retirement on May 19, 2014.

== Playing career ==
Mullins graduated from Waterford High School in 1974. She spent a year at the University of Connecticut's Avery Point campus, where she played for the club basketball team. She then transferred to UConn's main campus, was just beginning to establish women's intercollegiate sports. She was the first female athlete at Connecticut to receive a scholarship. She played four years of basketball and two years of softball for the UConn Huskies.

== Coaching career ==
After completing a master's in sport management at UConn, Mullins became head coach at Nichols College in Massachusetts. She led the team for two seasons, compiling a 10–10 record before moving to E. O. Smith High School as a basketball coach. In 1984, she returned to UConn as head softball coach. Mullins would remain at UConn for thirty one seasons, leading the Huskies to 10 top 2 finishes in the NCAA Northeast rankings, eight appearances in the NCAA Division I Softball Championship, a Women's College World Series berth in 1993, six Big East Conference regular season and seven Big East Conference softball tournament championships, and an overall record of 862–626–5. Over 96 percent of her players graduated, nine earned All-American honors, six were named academic All-Americans, and her players earned Big East Player or Pitcher of the Year awards 11 times. She retired as one of the top 50 all-time coaches in career wins. Mullins was one of the longest-tenured coaches at UConn, although many coaches also had remained in Storrs for multiple decades.

== Head coaching record ==
Record table
Season	Team	Overall	Conference	Standing	Postseason
Nichols (NCAA Division III) (1980–1981)
1980	Nichols	5–4			
1981	Nichols	5–6			
Nichols:		10–10			
Connecticut (Independent) (1984–1989)
1984	Connecticut	22–2			
1985	Connecticut	34–7			
1986	Connecticut	30–17–1			
1987	Connecticut	27–7–1			
1988	Connecticut	34–13			
1989	Connecticut	29–12			NCAA Regional
Connecticut (Big East Conference) (1990–2013)
1990	Connecticut	34–9			NCAA Regional
1991	Connecticut	35–18–1			NCAA Regional
1992	Connecticut	42–10	6–0		NCAA Regional
1993	Connecticut	45–14	7–1		Women's College World Series, 1–2
1994	Connecticut	29–18	15–2		NCAA Regional
1995	Connecticut	37–20	16–3		NCAA Regional
1996	Connecticut	36–22	16–4		NCAA Regional
1997	Connecticut	30–20	15–1		
1998	Connecticut	24–21–1	8–7		
1999	Connecticut	23–23	9–7		
2000	Connecticut	37–17	12–4		
2001	Connecticut	36–23	14–6		NCAA Regional
2002	Connecticut	13–36	5–15		
2003	Connecticut	24–23–1	12–8		
2004	Connecticut	23–23	6–12		
2005	Connecticut	20–25	8–10		
2006	Connecticut	19–29	6–14		
2007	Connecticut	22–21	10–9		
2008	Connecticut	22–22	13–7		
2009	Connecticut	29–22	11–12		
2010	Connecticut	21–30	7–15		
2011	Connecticut	19–30	6–15		
2012	Connecticut	21–27	9–13		
2013	Connecticut	26–27	8–14		
Connecticut (American Athletic Conference) (2014)
2014	UConn	13–38	3–17	8th	AAC tournament
Connecticut:		856–626–5 (.577)	222–196		
Total:		866–636–5 (.576)			
National champion Postseason invitational champion Conference regular season champion Conference regular season and conference tournament champion Division regular season champion Division regular season and conference tournament champion Conference tournament champion
