= Laura Valentino =

American softball coach

Current position
- Title: Head coach
- Team: UConn
- Conference: Big East
- Record: 141–82 (.632)

Biographical details
- Born: September 29, 1989 (age 37); Smithtown, New York, U.S.
- Education: Hofstra

Playing career
- 2008–2011: Hofstra
- Position: 3B

Coaching career (HC unless noted)
- 2012–2014: Fairfield (asst.)
- 2015–2017: Charlotte (asst.)
- 2018–2019: Duke (asst.)
- 2020–present: UConn

Head coaching record
- Overall: 208–129 (.617)

Accomplishments and honors

Championships
- 3 Big East regular season championships (2022, 2023, 2026); 2 Big East Tournament championship (2025), (2026)

Awards
- Big East Coaching Staff of the Year (2022)

Laura Valentino (born September 29, 1989) is an American softball coach, currently serving as head coach of the UConn Huskies softball team.

== Coaching career ==
=== Duke (asst.) ===
On June 27, 2017, Valentino was announced as assistant coach of the Duke softball program.

=== UConn ===
On July 3, 2019, Laura Valentino was announced as the new head coach of the UConn softball program.

== Head coaching record ==
Record table
Season	Team	Overall	Conference	Standing	Postseason
UConn Huskies (American Athletic Conference) (2020)
2020	UConn	16–5	0–0		
UConn Huskies (Big East Conference) (2021–Present)
2021	UConn	22–20	12–9	3rd	
2022	UConn	38–18	20–4	1st	
2023	UConn	34–15	19–5	1st	
2024	UConn	31–24	16–8	2nd	
2025	UConn	35–19	18–6	2nd	NCAA Regional
2026	UConn	32–28	18–6	T-1st	NCAA Regional
UConn:		208–129 (.617)	103–38 (.730)		
Total:		208–129 (.617)			
National champion Postseason invitational champion Conference regular season champion Conference regular season and conference tournament champion Division regular season champion Division regular season and conference tournament champion Conference tournament champion
