= Major League Baseball Urban Youth Academy =

Major League Baseball Youth Academies are a series of academies in American cities and one in Puerto Rico that provides free year-round instruction in baseball and softball to the areas' youth. The academies are run as not-for-profit organizations by Major League Baseball (MLB).

== History ==
The first Youth Academy opened in 2002 in Puerto Rico as the Puerto Rico Baseball Academy and High School. In 2006, the first Major League Baseball Urban Youth Academy in the United States was opened in Compton, California, providing free baseball and softball instruction to Southern California youth, ages 8–17. Since then academies have opened in Houston, Texas (2010), New Orleans, Louisiana (2012), Cincinnati, Ohio, and Washington, D.C. (2014).

== Locations ==
=== Cincinnati, Ohio ===
Located nine miles away from the Great American Ball Park is the P&G Cincinnati Major League Baseball Urban Youth Academy. The $5.5 million complex includes four outdoor baseball and softball fields and a 33,000-square-foot indoor facility that holds batting cages, pitching tunnels and another field. It provides free year-round instruction in baseball and softball to the area's youth and is affiliated with the Cincinnati Reds Major League Baseball team.

=== Compton, California ===
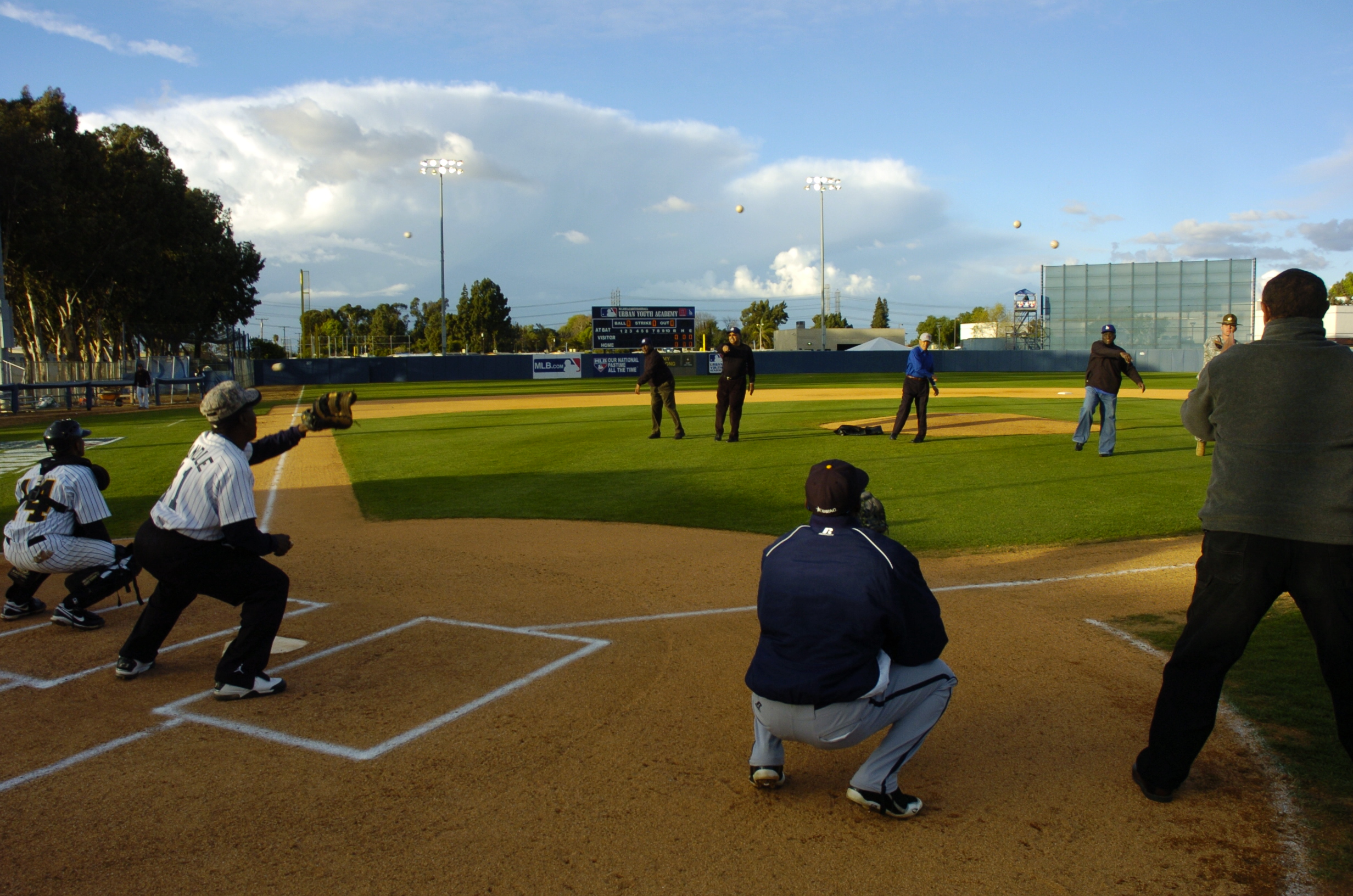
Ceremonial first pitch at Compton, CA MLB Youth Academy in 2011

The first academy located in the mainland United States was the Compton Academy in Compton, California. Encompassing 10 acres (40,000 m^{2}) on the campus of Compton Community College, the MLB Urban Youth Baseball Academy features state-of-the-art facilities including a show field; complete with scoreboard, a grandstand that seats nearly 200 fans, dugouts and lights; as well as an auxiliary field; softball field; youth field; and a 12,000-square-foot (1,100 m^{2}) clubhouse consisting of a weight room, locker room, and other training facilities. The complex also features batting cages and pitching mounds.

The academy operates on a year-round basis under the leadership of former Anaheim Angel Darrell Miller. An after-school program, week-long clinics accommodating approximately 200 youth per day is held, as well as month-long clinics. Over the course of the first year of operation, the academy expects to offer the free program to a minimum of 2,500 youth.

Players who have attended the Academy include Anthony Gose, Khris Davis, Trayvon Robinson, Aaron Hicks, Efren Navarro, J. P. Crawford, Dominic Smith, Dillon Tate, and Hunter Greene.

=== Houston, Texas ===
The Houston Major League Baseball Urban Youth Academy opened in 2010. It is located at Sylvester Turner Park on Houston’s north side. The main stadium at the academy has permanent seating for 500 fans, space for an additional 1,800 fans, dugouts and lights. There’s also one auxiliary field, two Little League/softball fields and 1,500 square feet of office space and other facilities.

=== New Orleans, Louisiana ===
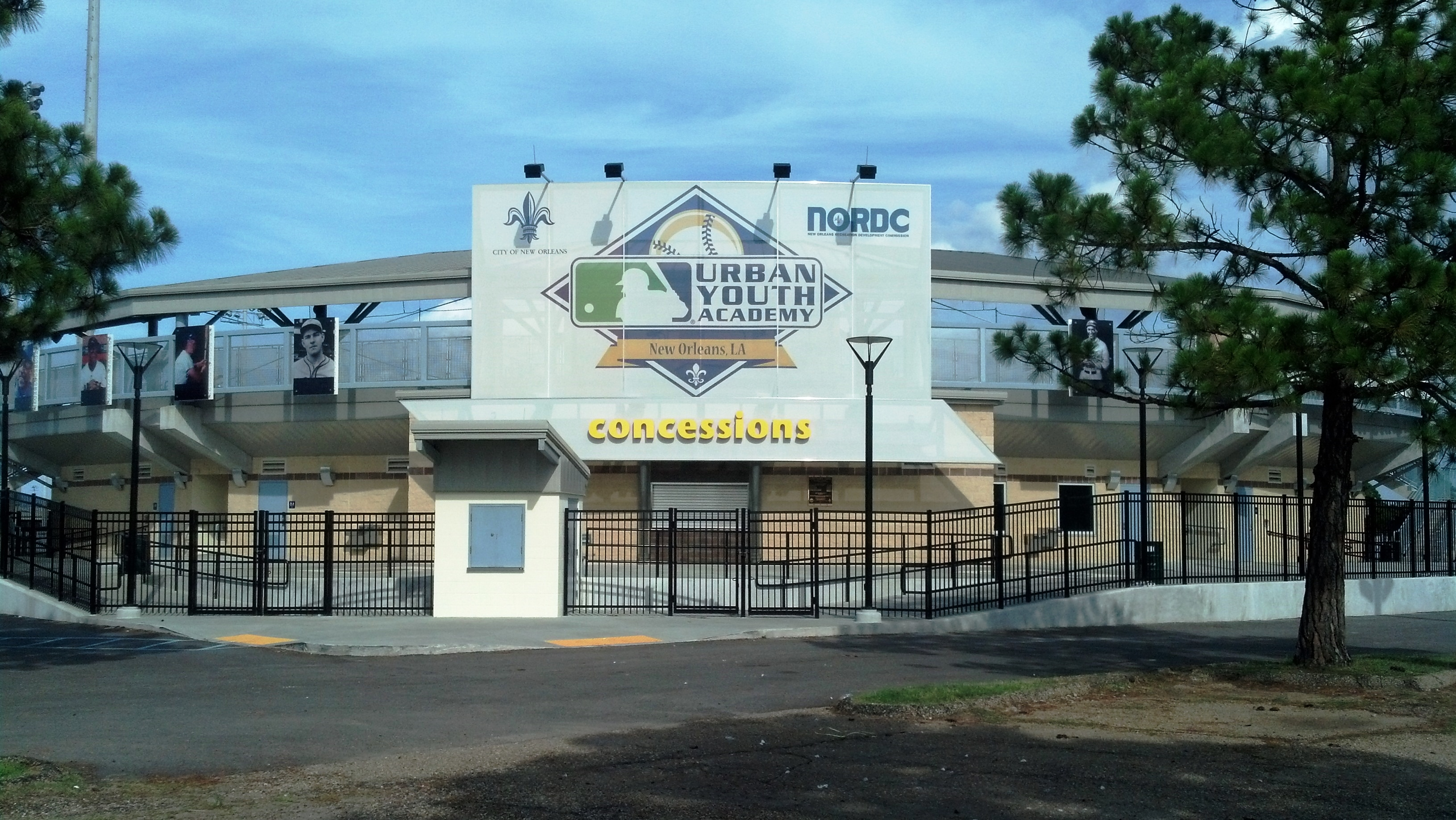
Wesley Barrow Stadium, Home Stadium of New Orleans MLB Youth Academy

The New Orleans Major League Baseball Urban Youth Academy opened in 2012 and is located at Wesley Barrow Stadium. It is a 650-seat baseball and softball stadium located in the Pontchartrain Park section of New Orleans, Louisiana. The stadium includes a 200-square-foot climate-controlled press box, a public address system and LED scoreboard. The baseball field features professional-sized artificial turf with a clay pitcher's mound and two fenced bullpens.

The facility also includes grass tee-ball fields, a three-lane outdoor batting practice cage and a two-lane indoor batting practice building. It also includes administration facilities and two 300-square-foot conference rooms.

It provides free, year-round baseball and softball instruction and other educational services for youth from underserved and urban communities throughout southern Louisiana.

=== Puerto Rico ===
The first Urban Youth Academy opened in 2002 in Puerto Rico as the Puerto Rico Baseball Academy and High School.

=== Washington, D.C. ===
The Washington Nationals Youth Academy is located in Washington, D.C. The academy is affiliated with the Washington Nationals Major League Baseball team and opened on March 4, 2014. The academy is located in Fort Dupont Park and consists of three fields used for baseball and softball. The facility also has a two-story structure featuring offices, locker rooms, training areas, batting cages, concession space, classrooms and meeting rooms. The academy is the home of the Georgetown Hoyas and Howard Bison softball teams as well as the D.C. Grays of the Cal Ripken Collegiate Baseball League. It is also the home of several high school and lower division college baseball teams including Marymount University, Gonzaga College High School, and Anacostia High School.

== Future academies ==
As of June 2015, additional academies were under development in Cleveland, Ohio; Detroit, Michigan; Hialeah, Florida (near Miami); Philadelphia, Pennsylvania, and San Francisco, California.

== See also ==
- Reviving Baseball in Inner Cities
