= 2022 Big East Conference softball tournament =

- Teams: 4
- Format: Double-elimination tournament
- Finals site: Cacciatore Stadium; Rosemont, Illinois
- Television: FS2

2022 Big East Conference softball standings
	Conf.				Overall
Team	W		L	PCT	W		L	PCT
UConn ‍†‍‍	20	–	4	.833	38	–	18	.679
Butler ‍‍‍	16	–	6	.727	31	–	17	.646
Villanova ‍‍‡‍^{y}	16	–	7	.696	32	–	24	.571
DePaul ‍‍‍	16	–	8	.667	29	–	24	.547
Providence ‍‍‍	11	–	13	.458	25	–	21	.543
Seton Hall ‍‍‍	9	–	14	.391	20	–	23	.465
Georgetown ‍‍‍	5	–	16	.238	15	–	28	.349
Creighton ‍‍‍	5	–	17	.227	15	–	27	.357
St. John's ‍‍‍	5	–	18	.217	12	–	35	.255
† – Conference champion ‡ – Tournament champion As of June 5, 2022; Rankings from NFCA/USA Today

The 2022 Big East Conference softball tournament was held at Cacciatore Stadium on the campus of the DePaul University in Rosemont, Illinois. The tournament ran May 12 through May 14, 2022 and determined the champion for the Big East Conference for the 2022 NCAA Division I softball season. The tournament champion earned the Big East Conference's automatic bid to the 2022 NCAA Division I softball tournament. The semifinals and finals were broadcast on Fox Sports 2.

== Format and seeding ==
The top four teams from the conference's round-robin regular season qualified for the tournament, and were seeded one through four. They played a double-elimination tournament.

Team	W	L	Pct.	GB	Seed
UConn	20	4	.833	—	1
Butler	16	6	.727	3	2
Villanova	16	7	.696	3.5	3
DePaul	16	8	.667	4	4
Providence	11	13	.458	9	—
Seton Hall	9	14	.391	10.5	—
Georgetown	5	16	.238	13.5	—
Creighton	5	17	.227	14	—
St. John's	5	18	.217	14.5	—

== Tournament ==
First Round
1	UConn	2
4	DePaul	6
2	Butler	0
3	Villanova	2
Lower round 1
1	UConn	4
2	Butler	1

Semi-Finals
4	DePaul	0
3	Villanova	1
Lower final
4	DePaul	2
1	UConn	6

Finals
3	Villanova	3
1	UConn	0

=== Game results ===
Date	Game	Winner	Score	Loser	Notes
May 12	Game 1	(4) DePaul	6–2	(1) UConn	
May 12	Game 2	(3) Villanova	2–0	(2) Butler	
May 12	Game 3	(1) UConn	4–1	(2) Butler	Butler eliminated
May 13	Game 4	(3) Villanova	1–0	(4) DePaul	
May 13	Game 5	(1) UConn	6–2	(4) DePaul	DePaul eliminated
May 14	Game 6	(3) Villanova	3-0	UConn	
May 14	Game 7	If necessary			
