= Kamphuis Field at Liberty Softball Stadium =

Softball stadium in Lynchburg, Virginia

- Interactive map of Kamphuis Field at Liberty Softball Stadium
- Location: Campus of Liberty University, Lynchburg, Virginia, United States
- Coordinates: 37.356456°N 79.177507°W
- Owner: Liberty University
- Operator: Liberty University
- Capacity: 1,000
- Executive suites: 1 (President's Suite)
- Surface: AstroTurf
- Scoreboard: Electronic with video board

Construction
- Opened: January 23, 2015
- Cost: $9 million+

Tenant
- Liberty Lady Flames softball (NCAA DI ASUN) (2015–present)

Liberty Softball Stadium is a softball venue in Lynchburg, Virginia. It is the home field of the Liberty Lady Flames softball team, a member of the NCAA Division I ASUN Conference. The stadium opened in January, 2015 and has a capacity of 1,000 spectators.

== History ==
Liberty Softball Stadium was built in 2014 on the site of the old Al Worthington Stadium after it was demolished. In March of 2014, Liberty University announced that they would be naming the stadium "Kamphuis Field at Liberty Softball Stadium" in honor of Dwayne Kamphuis, a hall of fame softball play and donor to Liberty University.

== Features ==
The stadium includes 1,000 chairback seats, home, visitor and umpires’ locker rooms, team room, situation room, coaches’ offices, indoor batting tunnels, two full bullpens and an expansive athletic training room. The state-of-the art pressbox houses all game operations, home and visiting radio booths, TV booth and President's suite.

The stadium features an AstroTurf field, with an artificial dirt infield.

== See also ==
- Liberty University Softball
- Liberty University Athletics
