= Parkway Bank Sports Complex =

Baseball park in Rosemont, Illinois, US

- Interactive map of Parkway Bank Sports Complex
- Former names: The Ballpark at Rosemont
- Location: 27 Jennie Finch Way; Rosemont, Illinois
- Coordinates: 41°58′51″N 87°52′19″W
- Capacity: 2,000
- Surface: Infield dirt and Fieldturf

Construction
- Opened: 2011

Tenants
- Chicago Bandits (NPF/AUSL) (2011–2021, 2026–present); Roosevelt University Lakers softball (NCAA); Big East Conference softball tournament (2014–2019)

Parkway Bank Sports Complex, also known as the Ballpark at Rosemont, is an outdoor baseball park used for fastpitch softball and baseball located in the American city of Rosemont, Illinois, a suburb of Chicago. It hosts the Athletes Unlimited Softball League and former National Pro Fastpitch women's softball team Chicago Bandits. It is located neighboring the Rosemont Dome, and is near Allstate Arena and newly constructed Impact Field, a larger ballpark used by the Chicago Dogs professional baseball team. The stadium opened in 2011 and has a seating capacity of 2,000.
