= Connecticut Softball Stadium =

Coordinates: 41.801878°N 72.256171°W

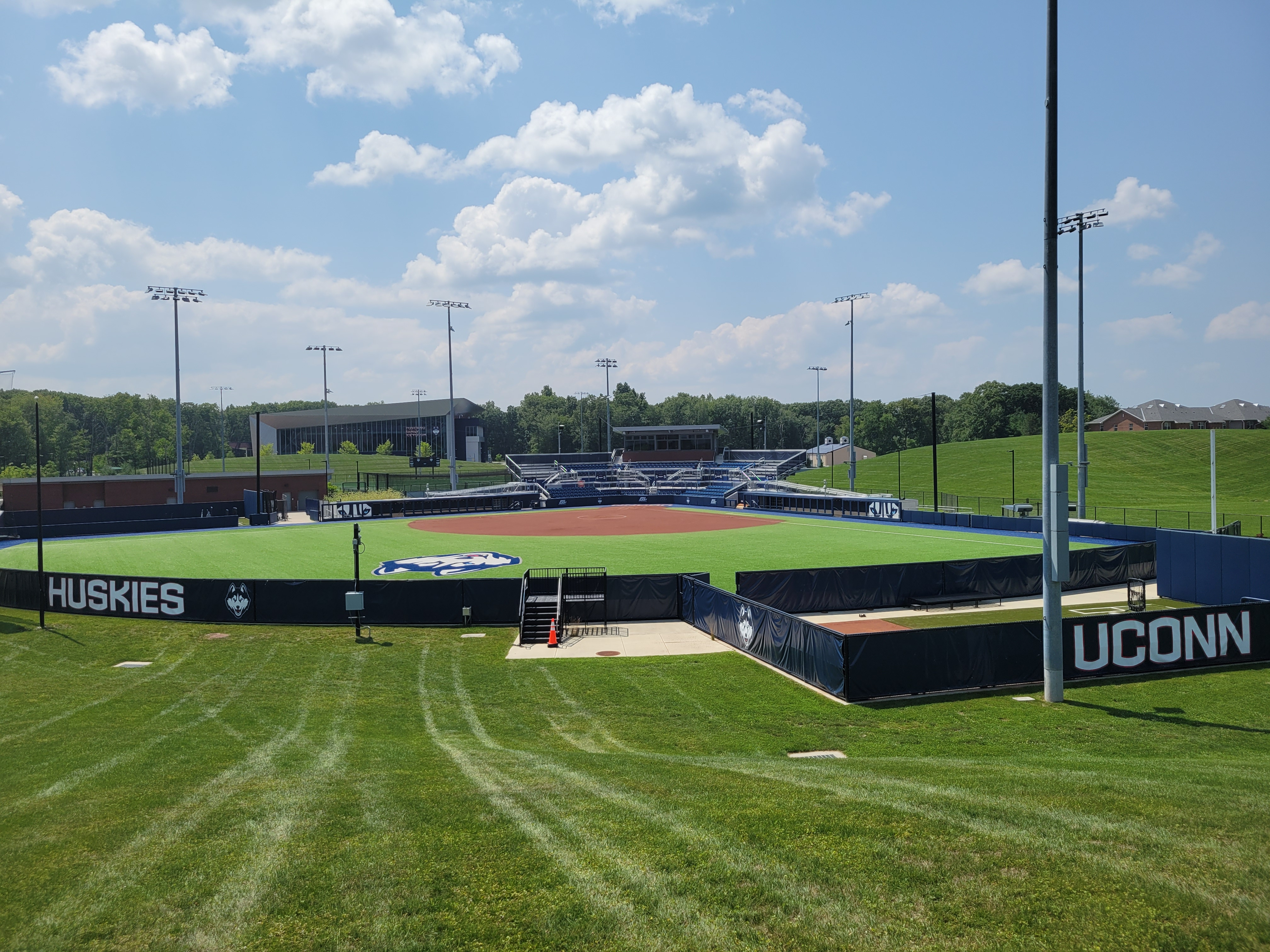
- Connecticut Softball Stadium
- Interactive map of Connecticut Softball Stadium
- Full name: Burrill Family Field at the Connecticut Softball Complex
- Location: Storrs, Connecticut
- Owner: University of Connecticut
- Capacity: 518
- Surface: Fieldturf

Construction
- Opened: 1987
- Renovated: 2020

Tenant
- Connecticut Huskies softball (NCAA)

Burrill Family Field at Connecticut Softball Stadium is the home field of the Connecticut Huskies softball team of the University of Connecticut. The stadium is located along Jim Calhoun Way, on the university's Storrs, Connecticut campus, adjacent to J. O. Christian Field and across from Morrone Stadium and the Burton Family Football Complex. The field is named for the Burrill Family, five of whom are UConn alums.

== Events ==
In addition to hosting UConn regular season softball games, the stadium has been the site of an NCAA Regional in 1990, and the 1992, 1993, 1997 and 1999 Big East Conference softball tournaments. The Huskies won the 1992 and 1993 events on their home field.

== Original facility ==
The original field had limited bleacher seating, but grass areas for up to 2,000 fans. The field was sparse in terms of amenities, with no concession area, simple dugouts, and a small shed for press and scoreboard operations. It was a grass field with a dirt infield.

== Renovations ==
The stadium closed after the 2020 season, with no home games having been hosted due to the COVID-19 pandemic. Construction of a new stadium began in the summer of 2020 with plans for completion in time for the 2021 season. This construction is part of the new athletic district that will see a new Morrone Stadium and baseball stadium (Elliot Ballpark) constructed for the Huskies. The new facility changed the orientation of the field so that the batters eye faces a more conventional northeast, and consists of a press box, sunken dugouts, 250 chairback seats, bleachers for 250 more people, and grass for additional spectators. Using field turf and lights, the facility will enable games in earlier spring and at night for the first time in program history. The stadium also has a player lounge and hitting facility on the first base side, with access to the Rizzo Performance Center for other facilities.

== Burrill Family ==
The Burrill Family's association and influence with the University of Connecticut and the state itself spans decades. Since the 1970s, the Burrill family, including Christian (MBA '07), Jessica ('01), Laura ('06) and Jeffrey, have been season ticket holders in UConn Men's Basketball, UConn Women's basketball, and UConn Football games for over 30 years. Bob and Barbara Burrill are both UConn graduates (Class of 1974).The Burrill family has generously supported UConn Athletics through various gifts, including the establishment of the Barbara and Bob (’74) Burrill Family Athletic Scholarship and Burrill Family Field at the Connecticut Softball Complex.
