= Butler Bulldogs softball =

NCAA Division I college softball team of Butler University

- 2023 Butler Bulldog softball team
- University: Butler University
- Athletic director: Barry Collier
- Head coach: Scott Hall (13th season)
- Conference: Big East
- Location: Indianapolis, IN
- Home stadium: Butler Softball Field (Capacity: 500)
- Nickname: Bulldogs
- Colors: Blue and white

NCAA Tournament appearances
- 2016

Conference Tournament championships
- Big East: 2016

The Butler Bulldogs softball team represents Butler University in NCAA Division I college softball. The team was founded during the 1980–1981 academic school year, and is a member of the Big East Conference (Big East). The Bulldogs play their home games at the Butler Softball Field on campus in Indianapolis, IN.

During their tenure in the Big East Conference, the Bulldogs have claimed 1 Big East Conference softball tournament title.

== History ==
The Bulldogs first fielded a varsity softball team in 1981 and have been a member of five (5) athletic conferences during their existence which includes the North Star Conference, Midwestern Collegiate Athletic Conference (MCC), Horizon League, Atlantic 10 and, as of 2014, the Big East Conference.

The Butler softball team has been led by Scott Hall for the last 12 seasons and is the 8th head coach in program history. Hall led the Bulldogs to a team record 4 tournament game wins in 2011 as well as a team record 16 conference wins in a single season in 2022. Hall also guided the Bulldogs to their first ever NCAA Tournament appearance in 2016 after capturing the programs first conference tournament championship.

=== Butler Softball Field ===
The Butler softball team calls the Butler Softball Field home, located adjacent to the Holcomb Gardens across the Inland Waterway Canal. The field is a part of a larger athletic field complex that features Varsity Field (the alternate field for both the men's and women's soccer teams), the outdoor tennis courts and intramural softball and soccer fields.

The facility underwent major renovations during the summer and fall of 2010. A new press box was built along with new bleachers and walkways. Also, the actual playing field was replaced and is now one of the best surfaces in the region. In 2010, the facility received a new infield surface with a natural sand and clay mix.

The field features brick dugouts for both the home and visiting benches, a bullpen area and batting cages located down the first base line out of play and spectator seating for up to 500 people. The field's outfield dimensions extend to 200 feet from foul pole to foul pole.

=== Head coaching history ===
Coach	Years	Record	Win Pct.
Barb Greenburg	1981 - 1994	263-226-4	.533
Jeryl Neff	1995 - 1997	48-88-1	.350
Tiffany Strnad	1998 - 1999	37-68-1	.349
Dirk Welch	2000 - 2002	49-84	.368
Tom Spencer	2003 - 2005	55-103-1	.346
Angie Nicholson	2006	17-30-1	.354
Jeanne Rayman	2007 - 2010	105-100	.512
Scott Hall	2011 – Present	295-329-1	.472
All-Time (41 years)	1981 – Present	869-1,028-8	.456

=== Conference affiliation ===
On March 20, 2013, the Butler administration announced that the school would join the reconfigured Big East, and moved to the new conference on July 1, 2013.

Years	Conference
1981 - 1986	North Star Conference
1987 - 2001	Midwestern Collegiate Athletic Conference
2002 - 2012	Horizon League
2013	Atlantic 10 Conference
2014 – Present	Big East Conference

== NCAA tournament results ==
Season	Overall Record	Conference Record	NCAA Regional Location	NCAA Tournament Results	NCAA Tournament Bid	Final RPI Ranking
2016	28-24	9-7	Lexington Regional	L, 1-6 vs. No 9 Kentucky; L, 1–2 vs. Illinois	Automatic	131st

== Season-by-season results ==
Statistics overview
Season	Coach	Overall	Conference	Standing	Postseason
Butler Bulldogs (North Star Conference) (1981–1986)
1981	Barb Greenburg	25-6			
1982	Barb Greenburg	26-9			
1983	Barb Greenburg	18-7			
1984	Barb Greenburg	6-13			
1985	Barb Greenburg	16-14			
1986	Barb Greenburg	14-22			
Butler Bulldogs (Midwestern Collegiate Conference) (1987–2001)
1987	Barb Greenburg	23-20	N/A	N/A	
1988	Barb Greenburg	20-16-1	N/A	N/A	
1989	Barb Greenburg	16-21	N/A	N/A	
1990	Barb Greenburg	21-23	4-6	6th	
1991	Barb Greenburg	25-21	6-4	3rd	
1992	Barb Greenburg	12-24	5-5	5th	
1993	Barb Greenburg	19-23	6-6	5th	
1994	Barb Greenburg	22-28-3	4-6	4th	
1995	Jeryl Neff	17-31	3-15	10th	
1996	Jeryl Neff	13-29	5-9	6th	
1997	Jeryl Neff	18-28-1	6-8	4th	
1998	Tiffany Strnad	24-25-1	10-2	2nd	
1999	Tiffany Strnad / Jamie Turner	32–24	13–7	4th	
2000	Dirk Welch	13-36	3-9	6th	
2001	Dirk Welch	21-25	3-9	T-6th	
Butler Bulldogs (Horizon League) (2002–2012)
2002	Dirk Welch	15-23	5-9	6th	
2003	Tom Spencer	18-31	8-13	5th	
2004	Tom Spencer	18-39-1	10-10	5th	
2005	Tom Spencer	19-33	7-12	6th	
2006	Angie Nicholson	17-30-1	4-16	8th	
2007	Jeanne Rayman	26-24	7-8	6th	
2008	Jeanne Rayman	17-29	5-12	7th	
2009	Jeanne Rayman	26-28	12-11	5th	
2010	Jeanne Rayman	36-19	11-11	T-5th	
2011	Scott Hall	32-24	14-8	3rd	
2012	Scott Hall	25-32	13-11	5th	
Butler Bulldogs (Atlantic 10 Conference) (2013–2013)
2013	Scott Hall	22-24	11-9	7th	
Butler Bulldogs (Big East Conference) (2014–Present)
2014	Scott Hall	24-28	10-10	T-4th	
2015	Scott Hall	24-27	9-12	4th	
2016	Scott Hall	28-24	9-7	4th	NCAA Regional
2017	Scott Hall	23-29	11-9	4th	
2018	Scott Hall	20-28	7-11	5th	
2019	Scott Hall	16-32	4-12	8th	
2020	Scott Hall	15-8	N/A	N/A	Season canceled due to COVID-19
2021	Scott Hall	17-21-1	6-11-1	5th	
2022	Scott Hall	31-17	16-6	2nd	
2023	Scott Hall	18-35	12-9	4th	
Total:		869–1,028–8 (.458)			
National champion Postseason invitational champion Conference regular season champion Conference regular season and conference tournament champion Division regular season champion Division regular season and conference tournament champion Conference tournament champion

== Conference tournament results ==
=== Midwestern Collegiate Athletic Conference ===
Season	Conference	Overall Record	Conference Record	Conference Regular Season Finish	Conference Tournament Results	Conference Tournament Finish
1987	MCC	23-20	N/A	3rd	W, 4-2 vs. Loyola; W, 5-3 vs. Detroit; L, 1-2 vs. Evansville; L, 1-3 vs. Detroit	3rd
1988	MCC	20-16-1	N/A	2nd	W, 2-1 vs. Loyola; L, 2-3 vs. Detroit; L, 1-2 vs. Evansville	3rd
1989	MCC	16-21	N/A	4th	L, 6-7 vs. Notre Dame; L, 6-7 vs. Evansville	6th
1990	MCC	21-23	4-6	6th	L, 1-6 vs. Dayton; L, 3-2 vs. Evansville	6th
1991	MCC	25-21	6-4	3rd	L, 3-7 vs. Loyola; W, 3-2 vs. Dayton; W, 1-0 vs. St. Louis; W, 3-0 vs. Loyola; L, 4-5 vs. Notre Dame	3rd
1992	MCC	12-24	5-5	5th	L, 0-5 vs. Evansville; L, 0-4 vs. Loyola	5th
1993	MCC	19-23	6-6	5th	W, 6-1 vs. La Salle; L, 0-1 vs. Notre Dame; L, 1-11 vs. Evansville	6th
1994	MCC	22-28-3	4-6	4th	W, 2-0 vs. Detroit; L, 5-7 vs. Notre Dame; W, 8-6 vs. La Salle; W, 9-8 vs. Detroit; L, 0-5 vs. Loyola	3rd
1996	MCC	13-29	5-9	6th	L, 0-6 vs. Cleveland State; L, 0-8 (6 in) vs. Green Bay	8th
1997	MCC	18-28-1	6-8	4th	L, 1-4 vs. Loyola; L, 0-1 vs. Detroit	7th
1998	MCC	24-25-1	10-2	2nd	W, 3-2 vs. Green Bay; W, 5-4 vs. Cleveland State; L, 0-2 vs. UIC; L, 0-6 vs. Detroit	3rd
1999	MCC	13-43	6-6	5th	L, 1-5 vs. Wright State; L, 0-4 vs. Green Bay	6th
2000	MCC	13-36	3-9	6th	L, 0-3 vs. Loyola; L, 0-2 vs. Detroit	7th
2001	MCC	21-25	3-9	6th	W, 7-3 vs. Wright State; L, 0-8 vs. UIC; L, 1-3 vs. Green Bay	4th

=== Horizon League ===
Season	Conference	Overall Record	Conference Record	Conference Regular Season Finish	Conference Tournament Results	Conference Tournament Finish
2002	Horizon League	15-23	5-9	6th	W, 8-2 vs. Detroit; W, 4-1 vs. Green Bay; L, 0-12 vs. UIC; W, 3-1 vs. Loyola; L, 1-8 vs. UIC	2nd
2003	Horizon League	18-31	8-13	5th	L, 4-7 vs. Green Bay; L, 6-11 vs. Loyola	7th
2004	Horizon League	18-39-1	10-10	5th	W, 3-0 vs. Detroit; W, 1-0 vs. Youngstown State; L, 1-10 vs. UIC; L, 0-1 vs. Wright State	4th
2005	Horizon League	19-33	7-12	6th	L, 1-2 vs. Cleveland State; L, 5-7 vs. Wright State	7th
2006	Horizon League	17-30-1	4-16	8th	L, 0-7 vs. UIC; L, 0-11 vs. Loyola	8th
2007	Horizon League	26-24	7-8	6th	W, 2-1 (12 in) vs. Green Bay; L, 2-7 vs. Wright State; W, 7-1 vs. Detroit; L, 1-2 (9 in) vs. Cleveland State	4th
2008	Horizon League	17-29	5-12	7th	L, 0-6 vs. Green Bay; W, 3-1 vs. Youngstown State; L, 1-2 vs. Loyola	7th
2009	Horizon League	26-28	12-11	5th	W, 8-1 vs. Youngstown State; L, 0-7 vs. Cleveland State; W, 2-0 vs. Green Bay; W, 12-4 vs. Loyola; L, 2-5 vs. Wright State	4th
2010	Horizon League	36-19	11-11	6th	W, 4-1 vs. UIC; L, 9-11 vs. Wright State; L, 2-3 vs. Green Bay	5th
2011	Horizon League	32-24	14-8	3rd	W, 4-0 vs. Wright State; W, 3-1 vs. Valparaiso; L, 1-2 vs. UIC; W, 5-4 vs. Valparaiso; W, 1-0 vs. UIC; L, 3-5 vs. UIC	2nd
2012	Horizon League	25-32	13-11	5th	W, 3-0 vs. Youngstown State; W, 6-1 vs. Valparaiso; L, 1-9 (6 in) vs. Loyola; L, 2-3 (8 in) vs. Valparaiso	3rd

=== Big East Conference ===
Season	Conference	Overall Record	Conference Record	Conference Regular Season Finish	Conference Tournament Results	Conference Tournament Finish
2016	Big East	28-24	9-7	4th	W, 10-6 vs. DePaul; W, 10-8 (8 in) vs. St. John's	1st
2017	Big East	23-29	11-9	4th	L, 3-9 vs. St John's	4th
2021	Big East	17-21-1	6-11-1	4th	W, 8-1 vs. DePaul; L, 1-4 vs. UConn; L, 5-14 vs. Villanova	3rd
2022	Big East	31-17	16-6	2nd	L, 0-2 vs. Villanova; L, 1-4 vs. UConn	4th
2023	Big East	18-35	12-9	4th	L, 6-9 vs. St John's; L, 2-4 vs. DePaul	6th

== See also ==
- List of NCAA Division I softball programs
