= UConn Huskies softball =

- 2026 UConn Huskies softball team
- University: University of Connecticut
- Head coach: Laura Valentino (6th season)
- Conference: Big East
- Location: Storrs, Connecticut, US
- Home stadium: Burrill Family Field (capacity: 2,000)
- Nickname: Huskies
- Colors: National flag blue and white

NCAA WCWS appearances
- 1993

NCAA Tournament appearances
- 1989, 1990, 1991, 1992, 1993, 1995, 1996, 2001, 2025, 2026

Conference tournament championships
- Big East: 1990, 1991, 1992, 1993, 1995, 1996, 2001, 2025, 2026; ECAC: 1985

Regular-season conference championships
- 1992, 1993, 1994, 1995, 1996, 1997, 2022, 2023, 2026

The UConn Huskies softball team represents the University of Connecticut in the sport of college softball in at the Division I level of the NCAA. The team was founded in the spring of the 1974–1975 academic school year, and is a member of the Big East Conference (Big East). They play their home games at Connecticut Softball Stadium on campus in Storrs, Connecticut.

In its inaugural season the UConn Huskies compiled a 4–4 overall record. The Huskies are currently led by seventh-year head coach Laura Valentino, who succeeded Jen McIntyre in 2019. McIntyre succeeded Karen Mullins in 2015. Mullins led the Huskies to an 849–558–5 record and appeared in 8 NCAA Division I softball tournaments over 30 years in Storrs. Valentino led the Huskies back to the Tournament in 2025.

During their initial tenure in the Big East Conference, the Huskies claimed seven Big East Conference softball tournament titles, six regular season championships and reached the 1993 Women's College World Series. Since returning to the Big East in the 2021 season, UConn has won three more regular season championships and two more tournament championships.

== Head coaches ==
This table is complete through the 2026 season.

Name	Seasons	W	L	T
Linda Hanson	7	65	49	1
Ruth Mead	2	31	22	0
Karen Mullins	31	862	626	5
Jen McIntyre	5	74	133	0
Laura Valentino	7	208	129	0

== See also ==
- List of NCAA Division I softball programs
