= Georgetown Hoyas softball =

Georgetown Hoyas
- Founded: 2006
- University: Georgetown University
- Head coach: Karla Ross (2nd season)
- Conference: Big East
- Location: Washington, District of Columbia, US
- Home stadium: Washington Nationals Youth Academy (capacity: 200)
- Nickname: Hoyas
- Colors: Blue and gray

The Georgetown Hoyas softball is the that team represents Georgetown University in NCAA Division I college softball. The team currently participates in the Big East Conference. Since 2025, the team is led by their head coach Karla Ross and assistant coach Camryn Dolby. The team plays its home games at Washington Nationals Youth Academy. The team was established in 2006, and played as an independent for three seasons before joining the Big East in 2009.

== See also ==
- List of NCAA Division I softball programs
