= Seton Hall Pirates =

Intercollegiate sports teams of Seton Hall University

- University: Seton Hall University
- Conference: Big East
- NCAA: Division I
- Athletic director: Bryan Felt
- Location: South Orange, New Jersey
- Varsity teams: 14 (6 men's, 8 women's)
- Basketball arena: Prudential Center (men’s); Walsh Gymnasium (men’s and women’s)
- Ice hockey arena: Richard J. Codey Arena
- Baseball stadium: Owen T. Carroll Field
- Softball stadium: Mike Sheppard, Sr. Field
- Soccer stadium: Owen T. Carroll Field
- Other venues: Richie Regan Recreation & Athletic Center
- Mascot: The Pirate
- Nickname: Pirates
- Fight song: "Onward Setonia"
- Colors: Blue and white
- Website: shupirates.com

The Seton Hall Pirates are the intercollegiate athletic sports teams representing Seton Hall University, located in South Orange, New Jersey. The Pirates compete as a member of the NCAA Division I level (non-football sub-level), primarily competing in the Big East Conference for all sports since the 1979–80 season.

Men's sports include baseball, basketball, cross country, golf, soccer and swimming & diving, while women's sports include basketball, cross country, golf, soccer, softball, swimming & diving, tennis and volleyball. Seton Hall canceled football (which was played in Division III) in 1982.

The university's athletic director is Bryan Felt. The program's mascot is The Pirate and colors are blue, gray, and white.

== Sports ==
Men's sports	Women's sports
Baseball	Basketball
Basketball	Cross country
Cross country	Golf
Golf	Soccer
Soccer	Softball
Swimming & diving	Swimming & diving
	Tennis
	Volleyball

=== Men's ===
==== Basketball ====
The university first sponsored men's basketball in 1903. The program won the National Invitation Tournament (NIT) in 2024 and 1953 and lost in the final of the 1989 NCAA Tournament to Michigan, 80–79 in overtime.

=== Former programs ===
==== Football ====
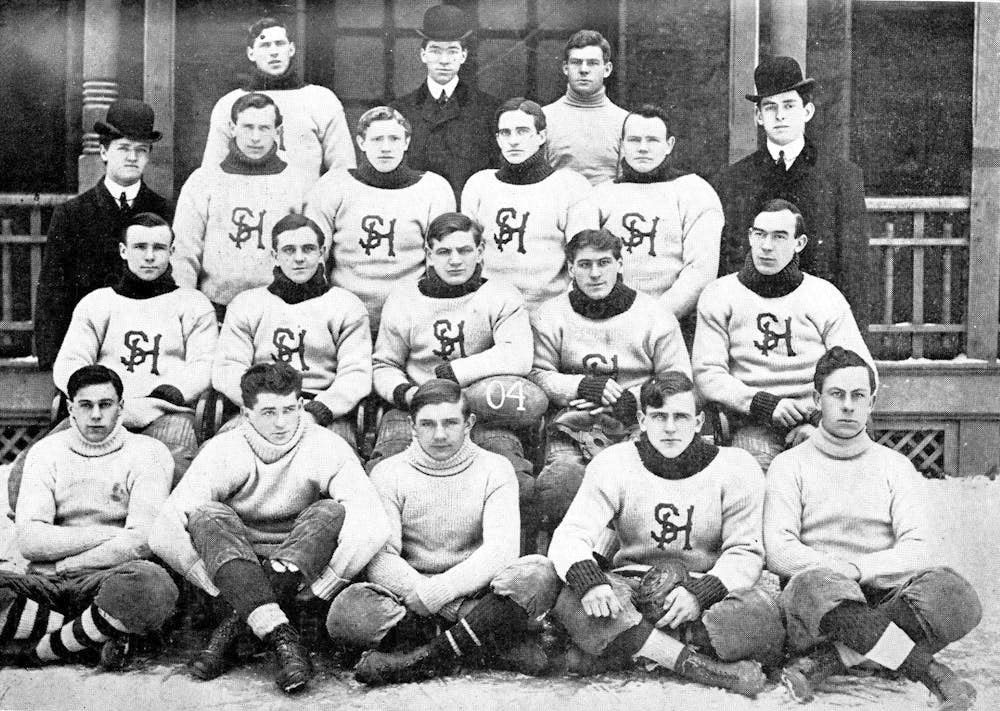
Early football team of Seton Hall

Seton Hall first fielded a football team in 1882, with an initial success that was interrupted in 1906 when the university decided to drop the program. After a brief comeback in 1913, the sport would be prohibited the following year. It was not until 1922 when football was reissued by the university, with a 30-0 victory over Cooper Union. The Pirates became an official NCAA team in 1973.

The sport's second stint at the school came in Division III. After several years of poor success, football was dropped in 1982.

==== Wrestling ====
The sport of wrestling was sponsored by the school until 2001 when the school decided to drop varsity sponsorship for financial purposes.
