= Atlantic 10 Conference softball tournament =

- Conference softball championship
- Sport: Softball
- Conference: Atlantic 10 Conference
- Number of teams: 6
- Format: Double-elimination tournament
- Current stadium: Bahoshy Softball Complex
- Current location: Bronx, NY
- Played: 1983–present
- Last contest: 2025
- Current champion: Fordham
- Most championships: UMass (23)

Host stadiums
- Billiken Sports Center (2026); Sortino Field (2000, 2003–2004, 2007, 2010, 2013, 2015–2016, 2019); URI Softball Complex (1988, 1997–1998, 2002); Tech Softball Park (1999); Patriots Park (1991–1994); Rutgers Softball Complex (1983–1984, 1986, 1989); Nittany Lion Field (1983, 1985, 1987)

Host locations
- St.Louis, MO (2026); Amherst, MA (1990, 1995, 1996, 2000, 2003–2004, 2007, 2010, 2013, 2015–2016, 2019); Kingston, RI (1988, 1997–1998, 2002); Blacksburg, VA(1999); Allentown, PA (1991–1994); Piscataway, NJ (1983–1984, 1986, 1989); State College, PA (1983, 1985, 1987)

The Atlantic 10 Conference softball tournament (sometimes known simply as the Atlantic 10 Tournament) is the conference championship tournament in college softball for the Atlantic 10 Conference. The winner receives the conference's automatic bid to the NCAA Division I softball tournament.

== Tournament ==
The top six regular season finishers compete in the double-elimination tournament.

=== History ===
In its initial format in 1983, the six team tournament included a single bye for the top two seeds. For the second year and lasting through 2006, only four teams qualified, and they played a true double-elimination tournament. With the addition of a tenth team to the league in 2007, the field was expanded again to six, and the original format reinstated. After the 2020 season was canceled, the 2021 Tournament used a four-team field and bracket and the six team format returned in 2022.

== Champions ==
=== Year-by-year ===
Year	School	Venue	Most Outstanding Player	Most Outstanding Pitcher
1983	Penn State	Nittany Lion Field • State College, PA and Rutgers Softball Complex • Piscataway, NJ	None	
1984	Rutgers	Rutgers Softball Complex • Piscataway, NJ	None	
1985	Penn State	Nittany Lion Field • State College, PA	Geri Saya, Penn State	Kim Gogol, Penn State
1986	UMass	Rutgers Softball Complex • Piscataway, NJ	Carol Frattaroli, UMass	Lynn Stockley, UMass
1987	UMass	Nittany Lion Field • State College, PA	Carol Frattaroli, UMass	Lisa Rever, UMass
1988	Penn State	URI Softball Complex • Kingston, RI	Nan Sichler, Penn State	Cathy Kaminski, Penn State
1989	UMass	Rutgers Softball Complex • Piscataway, NJ	Barbara Meehan, UMass	Holly Aprile, UMass
1990 (Note: The 1990 tournament was suspended due to weather prior to the championship round. UMass was awarded the automatic bid.)	UMass/Temple	Amherst, MA	Holly Aprile, UMass	Kelly McCarthy, Temple
1991	UMass	Patriots Park • Allentown, PA	Sherri Kuchinskas, UMass	Darlene Claffey, UMass
1992	UMass	Patriots Park • Allentown, PA	Sherri Kuchinskas, UMass	Holly Aprile, UMass
1993	UMass	Patriots Park • Allentown, PA	Sherri Kuchinskas, UMass	Darlene Claffey, UMass
1994	Rutgers	Patriots Park • Allentown, PA	Michelle Nikolayew, Rutgers	Meg Knudsen, Rutgers
1995	UMass	Amherst, MA	Sam Cardenas, UMass	Kelly Daut, UMass
1996	UMass	Amherst, MA	Danielle Henderson, UMass	None
1997	UMass	URI Softball Complex • Kingston, RI	Danielle Henderson, UMass	None
1998	UMass	URI Softball Complex • Kingston, RI	Danielle Henderson, UMass	None
1999	UMass	Tech Softball Park • Blacksburg, VA	Danielle Henderson, UMass	None
2000	UMass	UMass Softball Complex • Amherst, MA	Teri Rooney, UMass	None
2001	UMass	Dayton, OH	Gwen Rack, Rhode Island	None
2002	UMass	URI Softball Complex • Kingston, RI	Kaila Holtz, UMass	None
2003	UMass	UMass Softball Complex • Amherst, MA	Emily Robustelli, UMass	None
2004	Temple	UMass Softball Complex • Amherst, MA	Richelle Villescas, Temple	None
2005	UMass	Bahoshy Softball Complex • Bronx, NY	Jenna Busa, UMass	None
2006	UMass	Philadelphia, PA	Brandice Balschmiter, UMass	None
2007	UMass	UMass Softball Complex • Amherst, MA	Brandice Balschmiter, UMass	None
2008	UMass	Sue M. Daughtridge Stadium • Charlotte, NC	Brandice Balschmiter, UMass	None
2009	UMass	Bahoshy Softball Complex • Bronx, NY	Brandice Balschmiter, UMass	None
2010	UMass	UMass Softball Complex • Amherst, MA	Sarah Reeves, UMass	None
2011	Fordam	Sue M. Daughtridge Stadium • Charlotte, NC	Jen Mineau, Fordham	None
2012	UMass	Billiken Sports Center • St. Louis, MO	Sara Plourde, UMass	None
2013	Fordam	Sortino Field • Amherst, MA	Paige Ortiz, UMass	None
2014	Fordam	Bahoshy Softball Complex • Bronx, NY	Michele Daubman, Fordham	None
2015	Fordam	Sortino Field • Amherst, MA	Rachel Gillen, Fordham	None
2016	Fordam	Sortino Field • Amherst, MA	Rachel Gillen, Fordham	None
2017	Fordam	George Mason Softball Complex • Fairfax, VA	Meg Colleran, Fordham	None
2018	Fordam	Bahoshy Softball Complex • Bronx, NY	Madie Aughinbaugh, Fordham	None
2019 (Note: The 2019 championship game was canceled due to weather. Fordham was awarded the automatic bid.)	Fordham/George Washington	Sortino Field • Amherst, MA	Madie Aughinbaugh, Fordham	None
2020	Cancelled due to the COVID-19 pandemic			
2021	George Washington	SJU Softball Field • Merion Station, PA	Sierra Lange, George Washington	
2022	Fordham	George Mason Softball Complex • Fairfax, VA	Bailey Enoch, Fordham	
2023	George Mason	Bahoshy Softball Complex • Bronx, NY	Aly Rayle, George Mason	
2024	Dayton	Bahoshy Softball Complex • Bronx, NY	Chloe Wong, Dayton	
2025	Saint Louis	Mount Vernon Softball Field • Washington, D.C.	Abby Mallo, Saint Louis	
2026	Fordham	Billiken Sports Center • St. Louis, MO	Victoria Klimaszewski, Fordham	

=== By school ===
School	Championships	Years
UMass	23	1986, 1987, 1989, 1990, 1991, 1992, 1993, 1995, 1996, 1997, 1998, 1999, 2000, 2001, 2002, 2003, 2005, 2006, 2007, 2008, 2009, 2010, 2012
Fordham	10	2011, 2013, 2014, 2015, 2016, 2017, 2018, 2019, 2022, 2026
Penn State	3	1983, 1985, 1988
George Washington	2	2019, 2021
Rutgers	2	1984, 1994
Temple	2	1990, 2004
Dayton	1	2024
George Mason	1	2023
Saint Louis	1	2025

Italics indicate that the school no longer competes in Atlantic 10 Conference softball.
