= 2026 Atlantic 10 Conference softball tournament =

American college softball tournament

- Teams: 6
- Format: Double-elimination tournament
- Finals site: Billiken Sports Center; St. Louis, Missouri
- Champions: Fordham (10th title)
- Winning coach: Melissa Inouye (3rd title)
- MVP: Victoria Klimaszewski (Fordham)

2026 Atlantic 10 Conference softball standings
	Conf.				Overall
Team	W		L	PCT	W		L	PCT
Loyola Chicago ‍†‍‍	18	–	6	.750	28	–	24	.538
Saint Louis ‍‍‍	13	–	10	.565	23	–	28	.451
Dayton ‍‍‍	13	–	11	.542	26	–	24	.520
Fordham ‍‍‡‍^{y}	13	–	11	.542	27	–	28	.491
Saint Joseph's ‍‍‍	13	–	11	.542	27	–	26	.509
George Washington ‍‍‍	12	–	12	.500	23	–	22	.511
George Mason ‍‍‍	10	–	14	.417	26	–	25	.510
Rhode Island ‍‍‍	9	–	15	.375	21	–	26	.447
St. Bonaventure ‍‍‍	6	–	17	.261	9	–	44	.170
† – Conference champion ‡ – Tournament champion y – Invited to the NCAA tournament As of May 17, 2026; Rankings from NFCA/USA Today

The 2026 Atlantic 10 Conference softball tournament was held at Billiken Sports Center on the campus of Saint Louis University in St. Louis, Missouri from May 6 through May 9, 2026. The tournament was won by the Fordham Rams, who earned the Atlantic 10 Conference's automatic bid to the 2026 NCAA Division I softball tournament.

== Format and seeding ==
The top six finishers of the league's nine teams from the round-robin regular season qualified for the tournament. The top two seeds received a single bye, with the remaining teams playing opening round games.

== Tournament ==
Upper round 1	Upper round 2	Upper final	Final
1	Loyola	5
4	Fordham	7	4	Fordham	13^{(5)}
5	Saint Joseph's	3	4	Fordham	4
3	Dayton	1
2	Saint Louis	2
3	Dayton	3	3	Dayton	4
6	George Washington	2
4	Fordham	7	—
1	Loyola	4	—
Lower round 1	Lower round 2	Lower round 3	Lower final
1	Loyola	8
1	Loyola	6	3	Dayton	7
5	Saint Joseph's	6	5	Saint Joseph's	2
5	Saint Joseph's	8	2	Saint Louis	3
6	George Washington	4

== All Tournament Team ==
Player	Team
Hayden Baird	Dayton
Deirdre Flaherty	Dayton
Holly Beeman	Fordham
**Victoria Klimaszewski**	Fordham
Kate McGuire	Fordham
Neleh Nogay	Fordham
Anna Kiel	Loyola
Sierra Sass	Loyola
Liz Sedakis	Loyola
Averi Vander Woude	Loyola
Grace Brown	Saint Joseph's

MVP in bold
