= 2015 Atlantic 10 Conference softball tournament =

American college softball tournament

The 2015 Atlantic 10 Conference softball tournament was held at Sortino Field on the campus of the University of Massachusetts in Amherst, Massachusetts from May 6 through May 9, 2015. The tournament winner earned the Atlantic 10 Conference's automatic bid to the 2015 NCAA Division I softball tournament. All games were streamed online on the A-10 Network.

== Tournament ==
Upper round 1	Upper round 2	Upper final	Final
1	Dayton	5
4	George Mason	2	4	George Mason	8
5	La Salle	1	4	George Mason	2
3	Fordham	4
2	St. Louis	1
3	Fordham	5	3	Fordham	5
6	St. Bonaventure	1
3	Fordham	8	–
1	Dayton	2	–
Lower round 1	Lower round 2	Lower round 3	Lower final
4	George Mason	4
1	Dayton	8	1	Dayton	5
2	Saint Louis	4	5	La Salle	4
5	La Salle	4	5	La Salle	5
6	St. Bonaventure	3

- All times listed are Eastern Daylight Time.
