= Saint Louis Billikens =

Athletic program of Saint Louis University

- University: Saint Louis University
- Nickname: Billikens
- NCAA: Division I
- Conference: A-10
- Athletic director: Chris May
- Location: St. Louis, Missouri
- Varsity teams: 18
- Basketball arena: Chaifetz Arena
- Baseball stadium: Billiken Sports Center
- Soccer stadium: Robert R. Hermann Stadium
- Other venues: Enterprise Center
- Colors: SLU blue and white
- Mascot: The Billiken
- Website: slubillikens.com
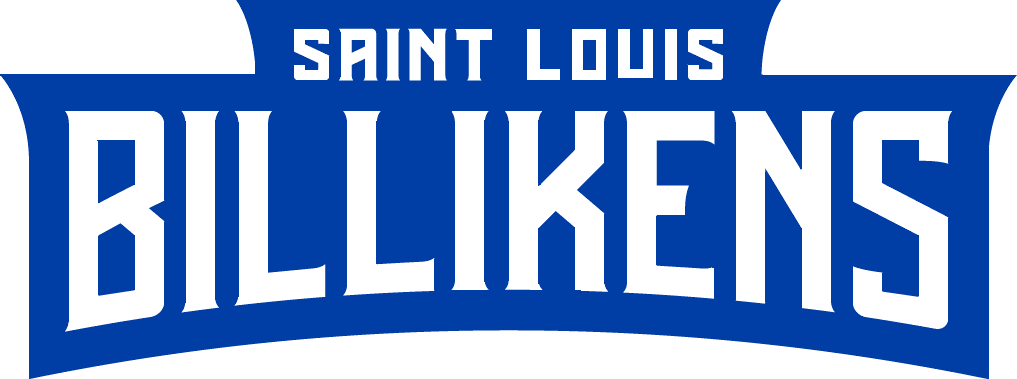

The Saint Louis Billikens are the collegiate athletic teams that represent Saint Louis University, located in St. Louis, Missouri. The Billikens compete in Division I of the National Collegiate Athletic Association (NCAA) as a member of the Atlantic 10 Conference (where they are the westernmost member, and both the first member located west of the Mississippi and in the Central Time Zone). The school has nationally recognized soccer programs for men and women. The school has heavily invested in its on-campus athletic facilities since the 1990s with the creation of Hermann Stadium and Chaifetz Arena. Chris May is the current director of athletics of the Saint Louis Billikens.

== The Billiken name ==
An early Saint Louis University football coach, John R. Bender, is said to have been the inspiration for the nickname "Billikens," which is still used by the school's athletic teams. During the 1911 season, according to one version of the story, local sportswriters commented that Bender bore an uncanny resemblance to a charm doll called a Billiken, which was a national fad at the time. His squad became known as "Bender's Billikens" and the name stuck.

== Sports sponsored ==
Men's sports	Women's sports
Baseball	Basketball
Basketball	Cross country
Cross country	Field hockey
Soccer	Soccer
Swimming and diving	Softball
Tennis	Swimming and diving
Track and field^{†}	Tennis
	Track and field^{†}
	Volleyball
† – Track and field includes both indoor and outdoor

A member of the Atlantic 10 Conference, St. Louis University sponsors teams in eight men's and ten women's NCAA sanctioned sports.

=== Baseball ===
In 2006, the Billiken baseball team earned the program's first NCAA tournament berth since 1966 by winning the Atlantic 10 Tournament. SLU's most successful baseball team of all time was the 1965 squad, which qualified for the NCAA Tournament and advanced to the College World Series.

Darin Hendrickson has been the head coach since 2008 and guided the Billikens to NCAA Tournament appearances in 2010 and 2013. The team plays at the Billiken Sports Center.

=== Basketball ===
Simply known to some as "The Program", the Billikens were ranked first in the first AP basketball poll during the 1948–1949 season.

Ed Macauley of the Basketball Hall of Fame and SLU won the NIT championship in 1948 and have played in the NIT 18 times, most recently in 2004. Larry Hughes of the Chicago Bulls played one season at SLU in the 1997–1998 season, where he was selected as the consensus national Freshman of the Year. They have made the NCAA Division I men's basketball tournament in 1952, 1957, 1994, 1995, 1998, 2000, 2012, 2013, 2014, 2019 and 2026. The Billikens are currently coached by Josh Schertz and has a popular celebrity fan base including John Stamos, Ruben Studdard, and Lil' Kim. The Program officially relocated from the Bauman-Eberhardt Center, the third oldest facility in NCAA Division I sports, to Chaifetz Arena on the eastern edge of campus for spring workouts in early April 2008.

Coach Rick Majerus died December 1, 2012.

=== Soccer ===
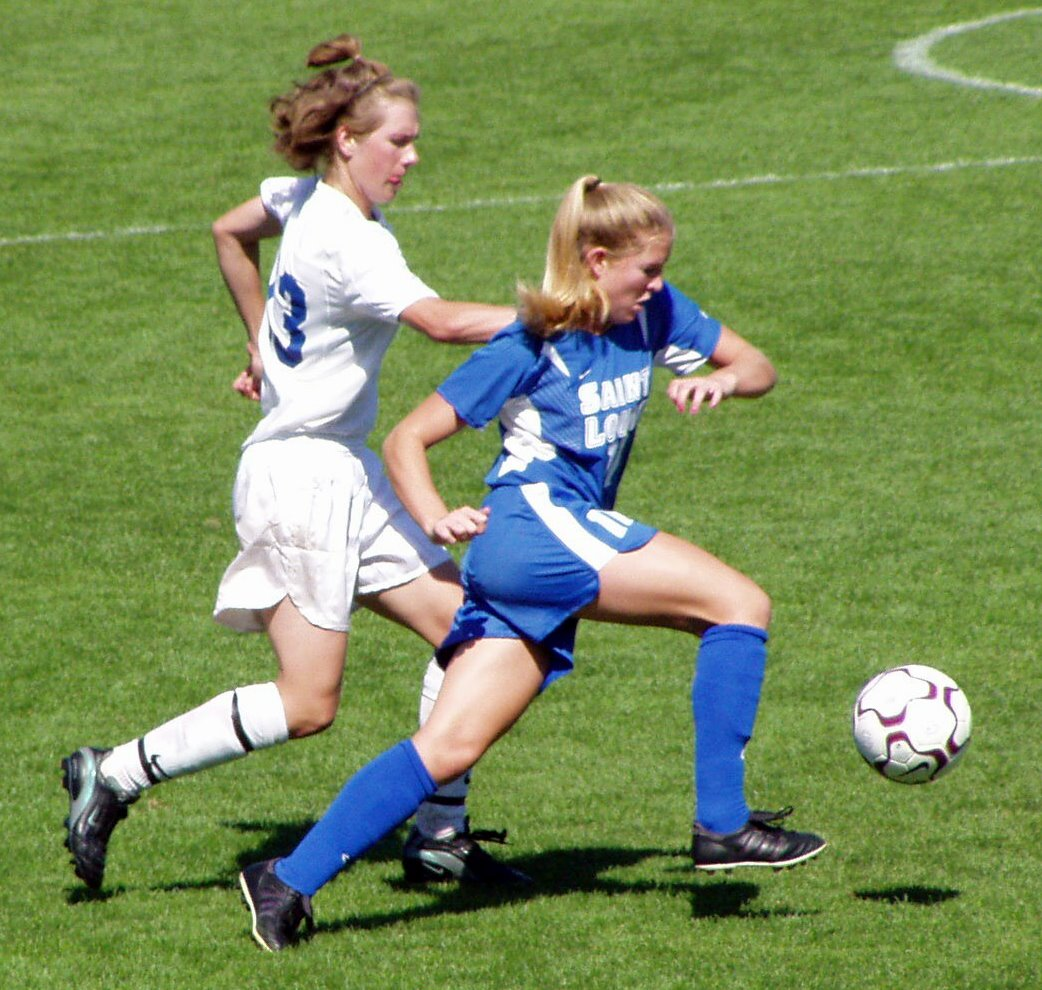
SLU women's soccer match in 2003

The men's soccer team has won 10 national titles (1959–60, 1962–63, 1965, 1967, 1969–70, 1972–73), the most in NCAA Men's Soccer Championship history. SLU also holds the record for most NCAA Tournament appearances with 44. Several Billikens have gone on to play professionally, including Shane Battelle, Brad Davis, Vedad Ibišević, Brian McBride, Matt McKeon, Al Trost, Dipsy Selolwane, Mike Sorber, Joe Clarke, Bob Madison, Martin Hutton, Jack Jewsbury, Tim Ward, Brett Branan, Will John, and Tim Ream. The soccer team plays at Hermann Stadium on campus. Since 2018, Kevin Kalish has been the head coach. Legion 1818 is the official supporters group for the team.

==== NCAA championships ====
- Men's Soccer: 1959, 1960, 1962, 1963, 1965, 1967(co-champion), 1969, 1970, 1972, 1973

=== Swimming and diving ===
St. Louis University head swimming and diving coach Jim Halliburton was inducted into the Missouri Sports Hall of Fame on Nov. 5 2018, during a ceremony held at the Chase Park Plaza Hotel in St. Louis. Now in his 18th season at Saint Louis, Halliburton has guided the Billiken men’s and women’s teams to more than 500 victories. He ranks sixth in career wins among NCAA Division I swim coaches.

=== Softball ===
Under head coach Christy Connoyer, the Billikens won their first Atlantic 10 Conference regular season title in 2023. However, the team has yet to win the Atlantic 10 Conference tournament and subsequently has failed to appear in the NCAA Division I softball tournament.

=== Volleyball ===
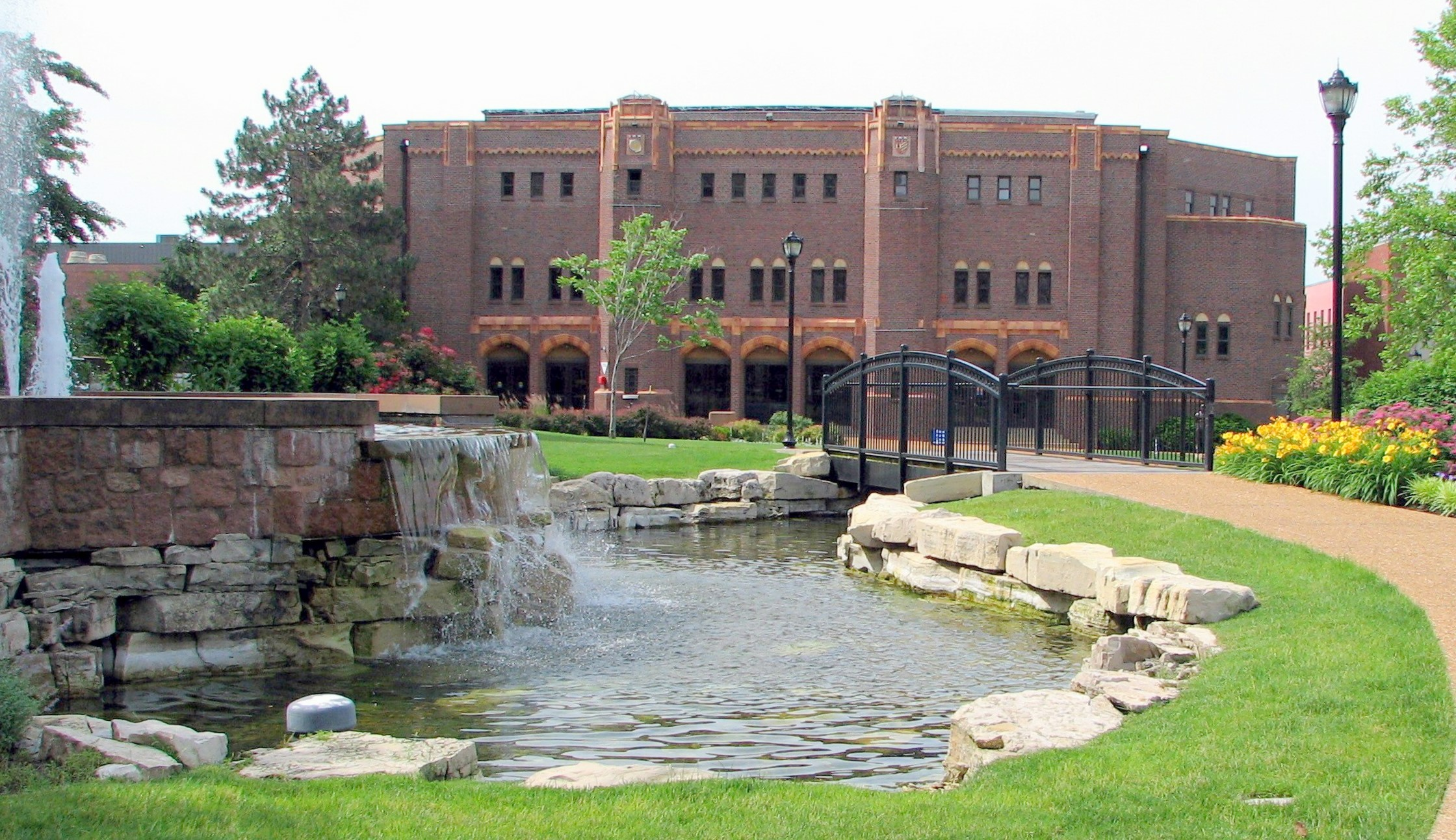
The Center for Global Citizenship, formerly West Pine Gymnasium, at Saint Louis University

Under head coach Anne Kordes, the women's volleyball team made its first-ever NCAA Tournament appearance in 2006, the program's first post-season bid since earning a spot in the 1995 National Invitation Tournament. The Billikens returned to the NCAA Tournament in 2008 and finished the season ranked No. 8 in the RPI and No. 21 in the final Bison/AVCA Coaches Top 25 Poll. Kordes led the Billikens back to the NCAA Tournament in 2009, receiving an at-large bid. The team plays its home games in the Chaifetz Pavilion on the eastern edge of campus.

=== Football ===
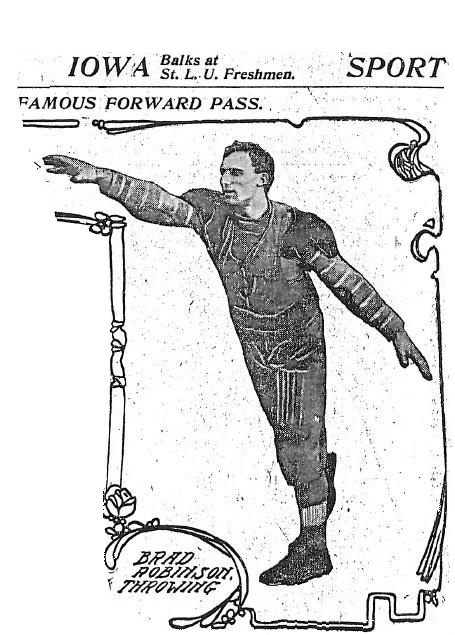
St. Louis Post-Dispatch photograph of Brad Robinson, who threw the first legal forward pass in 1906

The university fielded an intercollegiate squad from 1899 to 1949, going undefeated in 1901, 1904 and 1906. The final home game for the Billikens was on November 24, 1949, a 35–0 loss against Houston. Saint Louis finished the 1949 season with a 2–6–1 record. St. Louis competed at the club level during the late 1960s and early 1970s. Although the school no longer has a football team, they made a lasting mark on the sport as the 1906 team, coached by Eddie Cochems, threw the first legal forward pass in college football history, Bradbury Robinson to Jack Schneider on September 5, 1906, vs. Carroll College at Waukesha, Wisconsin.

=== Conferences ===
Logo of the Atlantic 10 Conference in St. Louis colors

SLU has had six conference affiliations since 1937. SLU has been affiliated with the Missouri Valley Conference (1937–1974); the defunct Metro Conference (1975–1982); the Midwestern Collegiate Conference, now known as the Horizon League (1982–1991); the defunct Great Midwest Conference (1991–1995) and Conference USA (which was created by a merger between the Metro and Great Midwest Conferences). SLU joined the Atlantic 10 Conference in 2005.

The Bilikens were a charter member of Conference USA in 1995, but left to join the A10 in 2005. By the time Saint Louis left C-USA, it was one of four members of the conference without football programs. The other three also left C-USA in 2005. Charlotte, which joined the A10 alongside SLU, returned to C-USA in 2013, the same year it launched a football program (becoming the only one of the four schools that now plays football). DePaul and Marquette both left for the Big East Conference, and in 2013 became two of the "Catholic 7" that formed the core of the reconfigured Big East Conference.

== Club sports ==
=== Ice hockey ===
SLU fields an American Collegiate Hockey Association (ACHA) Division II Men's Ice Hockey team in the Mid-American Collegiate Hockey Association (MACHA). The team plays home games at the Webster Groves Ice Arena Webster Groves, MO. Up until the 2006 season, SLU Hockey and Saint Louis University were working together to build an arena that would not only house the SLU Hockey team, but local youth organizations and campus uses. Ultimately, plans fell through and the team continues to call Webster Groves Ice Rink their home rink.

In 2011, the Billikens captured their first MACHA Gold Championship and advanced to the Central Region Qualifier before falling two games short of a National Championship birth.

In 2013, SLU Hockey hosted the ACHA Men's Division II National Championships at the Hardee's Iceplex in Chesterfield, MO. 16 teams from around the United States competed for the right to claim the National Championship. SLU Hockey went 1-2 in pool play and failed to advance and Michigan State University would claim the National Championship. The tournament also featured a St. Louis Blues Alumni vs. ACHA Division II All-Stars game to raise money for local charities around the St. Louis area.

In 2013, rumors of a new hockey rink being built on or near SLU campus began to surface that would finally bring the SLU Hockey team and youth hockey back to the city of St. Louis. This new facility would act both as the St. Louis Blues (NHL) Official Practice Facility and home for SLU Hockey. Meeting between former SLU President Lawrence Biondi and Blues executive Bruce Affleck were rumored to have taken place and locations scouted for a possible rink.

St. Louis University once fielded an NCAA Division I hockey program that played in the CCHA from the 1970–1971 season until the program ended in 1979. The team was a strong team in the CCHA and over the nine seasons of play SLU made the championship six times.

The current club hockey team began play during the 1996–1997 season as a member of ACHA Division I.

=== Lacrosse ===
St. Louis University (SLU) Men's Lacrosse team competes in the Men's Collegiate Lacrosse Association (MCLA) Division II and the Great Rivers Lacrosse Conference (GRLC). The program was founded in 1992. SLU has previously placed players on the All-American, 1st Team, 2nd Team, 3rd Team All-Conference, Honorable Mention Lists and the MCLA Scholar Athletes. The team is compiled mostly from students, who have played in elite Jesuit & Catholic high school programs across the country. Each individual brings their own unique skills, talents, and tricks. SLU Lax is known to play games commonly on the SLU Medical Center Stadium. Every year SLU competes against big Missouri schools such as Lindenwood University, Washington University in St. Louis, and Missouri State University just to name a few.

==== Coaching history ====
- 2009 – Matt Gardiner, currently the Commissioner for the GRLC
- 2010 – Ron Kelam
- 2011 – Michael Van Tiem
- 2012–present – Jimmy Greene
