= Bridget Orchard =

American softball coach

Current position
- Title: Head coach
- Team: Villanova
- Conference: Big East

Biographical details
- Education: Villanova

Playing career
- 1994–1997: Villanova
- Position: Second Baseman

Coaching career (HC unless noted)
- 1998–2001: Cabrini
- 2002–2018: Fordham
- 2019–present: Villanova

Head coaching record
- Overall: 961–567–4 (.629)
- Tournaments: 10–22 (.313)

Accomplishments and honors

Championships
- 4× CSAC regular season (1998–2001); 2× CSAC tournament (2000, 2001); 5× A-10 regular season (2005, 2009, 2014, 2016, 2017); 7× A-10 tournament (2011, 2013–2018); 1× Big East regular season (2024); 3× Big East tournament (2021, 2022, 2024)

Awards
- 3× CSAC Coach of the Year (1998, 2000, 2001); 6× A-10 Coach of the Year (2005, 2010, 2011, 2014, 2016, 2017)

Bridget Orchard (née Baxter) is an American softball coach who is currently the head coach at Villanova. From 1998 until 2001, she was the head coach at NCAA Division III Cabrini. From 2001 until 2018, she was the head coach at Fordham.

== Coaching career ==
=== Cabrini ===
After graduating from Villanova University in 1997, Orchard was hired by Cabrini University to serve as the school's softball coach. Orchard immediately turned the program around, providing the school with its first ever winning season in 1998. The team would continue to improve their record each year in the four seasons under Orchard, ultimately winning four regular season titles and two conference tournament titles. The 2001 team set a record for most wins in a season in program history.

At the end of the 2001 season, Orchard was named head coach at Fordham.

=== Fordham ===
In a similar situation to what she had faced at Cabrini, Fordham had failed to achieve a single winning season prior to her hiring. The 2002 season would prove to be Orchard's only losing season as coach at Fordham, turning the program into a dynasty in the Atlantic 10. Under Orchard's watch, the program won five regular season titles, seven conference tournament championships, and appeared in the NCAA Division I softball tournament eight times. In the 2010 and 2015 tournaments, Fordham advanced to the Regional Finals before being eliminated from the tournament, the best postseason performances in program history.

On June 1, 2018, Orchard resigned from her position of head coach at Fordham.

=== Villanova ===
On the same day of her resignation at Fordham, Orchard was hired at her alma mater, Villanova, as head coach. In 2021, the Wildcats won the Big East Conference softball tournament for the first time in program history, defeating UConn in two straight games. The team advanced to the NCAA Division I softball tournament for the first time in program history, managing to defeat UMBC before being eliminated from the tournament by Ole Miss.

== Head coaching record ==
Record table
Season	Team	Overall	Conference	Standing	Postseason
Cabrini Cavaliers (Colonial States Athletic Conference) (1998–2001)
1998	Cabrini	22–14–1	13–3	1st	
1999	Cabrini	26–14–1	17–3	1st	
2000	Cabrini	39–9	21–1	1st	NCAA DIII Tournament
2001	Cabrini	42–5	21–1	1st	NCAA DIII Tournament
Cabrini:		129–42–2 (.751)	72–8 (.900)		
Fordham Rams (Atlantic 10 Conference) (2002–2018)
2002	Fordham	14–43	3–18	T–7th	
2003	Fordham	37–19	10–6	4th	
2004	Fordham	35–24–1	8–6	4th	
2005	Fordham	38–16	15–1	1st	
2006	Fordham	37–23	13–5	3rd	
2007	Fordham	39–20	16–4	2nd	
2008	Fordham	36–30	11–9	4th	
2009	Fordham	37–22	13–7	4th	
2010	Fordham	49–12	16–2	2nd	NCAA Regionals
2011	Fordham	42–18	16–4	1st	NCAA Regionals
2012	Fordham	32–26	14–6	2nd	
2013	Fordham	36–23	15–7	T–2nd	NCAA Regionals
2014	Fordham	36–20	13–3	1st	NCAA Regionals
2015	Fordham	38–20	17–5	3rd	NCAA Regionals
2016	Fordham	39–21	18–4	1st	NCAA Regionals
2017	Fordham	46–17	18–5	1st	NCAA Regionals
2018	Fordham	33–23	18–4	2nd	NCAA Regionals
Fordham:		624–377–1 (.623)	234–96 (.709)		
Villanova Wildcats (Big East Conference) (2019–present)
2019	Villanova	29–24	9–8	4th	
2020	Villanova	14–13	0–0	N/A	Season cut short due to COVID-19 pandemic
2021	Villanova	36–14	15–2	2nd	NCAA Regionals
2022	Villanova	32–24	16–7	3rd	NCAA Regionals
2023	Villanova	37–22	18–6	T–2nd	
2024	Villanova	33–24	19–5	1st	NCAA Regionals
2025	Villanova	27–26–1	15–9	T–3rd	
2026	Villanova	0–0	0–0		
Villanova:		208–147–1 (.586)	92–37 (.713)		
Total:		961–567–4 (.629)			
National champion Postseason invitational champion Conference regular season champion Conference regular season and conference tournament champion Division regular season champion Division regular season and conference tournament champion Conference tournament champion
