= 2013 Georgia State Panthers softball team =

American college softball season

2013 Georgia State Panthers softball
- Conference: Colonial Athletic Association
- Record: 36-19 (13-8 CAA)
- Head coach: Roger Kincaid
- Home stadium: Robert E. Heck Baseball Complex

The 2013 Georgia State Panthers softball team represented Georgia State University in the 2013 NCAA Division I softball season. The Panthers competed in the Colonial Athletic Association and were led by then third-year head coach Roger Kincaid. Georgia State played its home games at the Robert E. Heck Softball Complex in Panthersville, Georgia.

== Roster ==
2012 Georgia State roster
Pitchers: 45 Emily Clay – Sophomore; 24 Kaitlyn Medlam – Junior; 15 Katie Worley	Catchers: 12 Taylor Scarpantonio – Sophomore; 25 Maddy Stanton – Junior; 21 Hunter Williamson - "Freshman"; Infielders: 1 Taylor Anderson - "Freshman"; 8 Callie Alford – Sophomore; 17 Jordan Brown - "Freshman"; 18 Lauren Coleman – Junior; 29 Megan Kildahl – Junior; 10 Whitney Phillips – Senior; 11 Brenna Morrissey - "Senior"; 20 Paige Nowacki - "Senior"	Outfielders: 2 Ashley Christy – Sophomore; 23 Jessica Clifton - Junior; 3 Bethany Horne – Sophomore; 30 Audrey Mason – Senior; 7 Shannyn Palazzo – Sophomore; 22 Carrie Williams - Senior; 28 MeQuilla Franklin – Freshman

== Schedule ==
2013 Georgia State Panthers Softball Game Log
Regular season
February

#	Date	Opponent	Site/stadium	Score	Overall record	CAA record
1	February 8	Troy	Starkville, MS	3-5	0-1	-
2	February 8	Southern Illinois-Edwardsville	Starkville, MS	10-9	1-1	-
3	February 9	Mississippi State	Starkville, MS	1-9	1-2	-
4	February 9	South Alabama	Starkville, MS	0-8	1-3	-
-	February 10	Southern Illinois-Edwardsville	Starkville, MS	cancelled	1-3	-
-	February 10	Tennessee State	Starkville, MS	cancelled	1-3	-
5	February 17	Northern Kentucky	Bob Heck Field	10-0	2-3	-
6	February 16	Presbyterian College	Bob Heck Field	15-16	2-4	-
7	February 17	Northern Kentucky	Bob Heck Field	8-2	3-4	-
8	February 17	Oakland	Bob Heck Field	11-2	4-4	-
9	February 20	Auburn	Auburn, AL	4-1	5-4	-
10	February 23	Northern Colorado	Bob Heck Field	7-8	5-5	-
11	February 23	Akron	Bob Heck Field	0-2	5-6	-
12	February 24	North Carolina State	Bob Heck Field	5-1	6-6	-
13	February 24	Troy	Bob Heck Field	7-8	6-7	-
14	February 27	Mercer	Macon, GA	5-0	7-7	-
15	February 27	Mercer	Macon, GA	9-6	8-7	-

March

#	Date	Opponent	Site/stadium	Score	Overall record	CAA record
16	March 1	Central Connecticut	Tampa, FL	3-1	9-7	-
17	March 1	Western Michigan	Tampa, FL	11-1	10-7	-
18	March 2	Kent State	Tampa, FL	9-3	11-7	-
19	March 2	Stephen F. Austin	Tampa, FL	3-2	12-7	-
20	March 3	St. Joseph's	Tampa, FL	9-3	12-8	-
21	March 7	Eastern Illinois	Bob Heck Field	6-5	13-8	-
22	March 7	Eastern Illinois	Bob Heck Field	4-3	14-8	-
23	March 19	Jacksonville State	Bob Heck Field	11-3	15-8	-
24	March 20	Alabama	Tuscaloosa, AL	1-9	15-9	-
25	March 23	George Mason	Bob Heck Field	5-0	16-9	1-0
26	March 23	George Mason	Bob Heck Field	7-4	17-9	2-0
27	March 24	George Mason	Bob Heck Field	2-1	18-9	3-0
28	March 26	Kennesaw State	Bob Heck Field	1-0	19-9	3-0
29	March 27	Chattanooga	Chattanooga, TN	3-1	20-9	3-0
30	March 29	Hofstra	Hempstead, NY	3-2	21-9	4-0
31	March 29	Hofstra	Hempstead, NY	1-7	21-10	4-1
32	March 30	Hofstra	Hempstead, NY	1-2	21-11	4-2

April

#	Date	Opponent	Site/stadium	Score	Overall record	CAA record
33	April 2	Kennesaw State	Kennesaw, GA	7-3	22-11	4-2
34	April 3	Furman	Bob Heck Field	2-6	22-12	4-2
35	April 3	Furman	Bob Heck Field	3-1	23-12	4-2
36	April 6	Towson	Towson, MD	1-2	23-13	4-3
37	April 6	Towson	Towson, MD	5-2	24-13	5-3
38	April 7	Towson	Towson, MD	3-4	24-14	5-4
39	April 10	Georgia Southern	Bob Heck Field	8-0	25-14	5-4
40	April 10	Georgia Southern	Bob Heck Field	4-5	25-15	5-4
41	April 13	UNC Wilmington	Bob Heck Field	8-2	26-15	6-4
42	April 13	UNC Wilmington	Bob Heck Field	2-4	26-16	6-5
43	April 14	UNC Wilmington	Bob Heck Field	1-0	27-16	7-5
44	April 18	Samford	Bob Heck Field	3-1	28-16	7-5
45	April 18	Samford	Bob Heck Field	6-4	29-16	7-5
46	April 20	Drexel	Philadelphia, PA	7-6	30-16	8-5
47	April 20	Drexel	Philadelphia, PA	9-0	31-16	9-5
48	April 21	Drexel	Philadelphia, PA	9-0	32-16	10-5
49	April 24	Georgia	Athens, GA	10-7	33-16	10-5
50	April 27	Delaware	Bob Heck Field	6-5	34-16	11-5
51	April 27	Delaware	Bob Heck Field	8-0	35-16	12-5
52	April 28	Delaware	Bob Heck Field	6-4	36-16	13-5

May

#	Date	Opponent	Site/stadium	Score	Overall record	CAA record
53	May 3	James Madison	Harrisonburg, VA	3-7	36-17	13-6
54	May 3	James Madison	Harrisonburg, VA	4-5	36-18	13-7
55	May 4	James Madison	Harrisonburg, VA	0-8	36-19	13-8
