= Saint Joseph's Hawks softball =

College softball team

Saint Joseph's Hawks
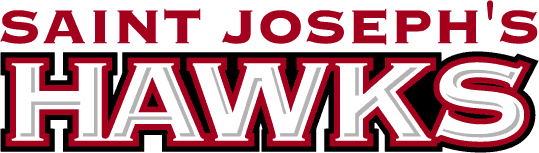
- University: Saint Joseph's University
- Head coach: Gina McCool (1st season)
- Conference: Atlantic 10
- Location: Philadelphia, Pennsylvania, US
- Home stadium: SJU Softball Field (capacity: 400)
- Nickname: Hawks
- Colors: Crimson and gray

Regular-season conference championships
- 2013

The Saint Joseph's Hawks softball team represents Saint Joseph's University in the NCAA Division I college softball. The team participates in the Atlantic 10 Conference (A-10). The Hawks are currently led by head coach Gina McCool. The team plays its home games at SJU Softball Field located on the university's campus.

== History ==
The Hawks have won the Atlantic 10 Conference regular season title once, doing so in 2013. However, the team has failed to win the Atlantic 10 Conference tournament after being defeated in three games in 2013 by Fordham. Because of this, they have also failed to qualify for the NCAA Division I softball tournament.

The team has won several awards over its tenure in the Atlantic 10. The Hawks have won the Atlantic 10 Player of the Year award twice, doing so in 1995 with Danielle Cavone and in 2008 with Brooke Darreff. Pitcher Bonnie Gasior was named Atlantic 10 Pitcher of the Year twice. Former coach Terri Adams was named Atlantic 10 Coach of the Year in 2013.

On April 18, 2015, in a game against Fordham, centerfielder Bella Picard was injured sliding headfirst into second base after colliding with Fordham shortstop Allie Bradian. Picard's head made contact with Bradian's knee, knocking Picard unconscious and fracturing her fifth cervical vertebra, losing feeling and mobility on her right side. Picard escaped a spinal cord injury and potential paralysis by mere millimeters. After successful spinal fusion surgery and several years of rehabilitative therapy, Picard was able to walk again as of 2019. Through her rehab process, Picard connected with several other athletes who faced similar injuries, including former college baseball player Cory Hahn, former college football player Eric LeGrand, and former professional ice hockey player Denna Laing.

On May 20, 2023, head coach Erin Brooks resigned and was replaced by Gina McCool.

=== Coaching history ===
Years	Coach	Record	%
1983	Jim Foster	8–3	.727
1984	George Webster	4–9	.308
1985–1990	Bob Shaw	58–125	.317
1991–2001	Charlie Wieners	331–185–4	.640
2001	Larry Dougherty	7–4	.636
2002–2006	Moo Moyer	112–122–1	.479
2007–2017	Terri Adams	273–233–3	.539
2018–2023	Erin Brooks	125–132	.486
2024–present	Gina McCool	0–0	–

== Roster ==
2024 Saint Joseph's Hawks roster
Pitchers: 21 – Jules Scogna – Sophomore; 1 – Karlee Smith – Junior; 10 – Emily Siler – Senior; 26 – Taylor Trowbridge – Sophomore; 22 – Jenna Wagner – Freshman; Catchers: 18 – Jenna Currie – Sophomore; 17 – Shelby LaMont – Sophomore	Infielders: 12 – Lauren Pscolka – Senior; 11 – Kayla Tauber – Junior; Outfielders: 13 – Nicole Bondoc – Junior; 24 – Gianna Muhaw – Freshman; 25 – Meghan Sinkus – Sophomore; 3 – Riley York – Junior; Utility: 32 – Sarah Cancila – Junior; 15 – Sierra Fretz – Junior; 6 – Morgan Lester – Freshman; 30 – Kasi Loser – Freshman; 23 – Hailey Malito – Junior; 2 – Haley McMenamin – Freshman

== Season-by-season results ==
Record table
Season	Coach	Overall	Conference	Standing	Postseason
Saint Joseph's Hawks (Atlantic 10 Conference) (1983–present)
1983	Jim Foster	8–3			
1984	George Webster	4–9			
1985	Bob Shaw	5–13	0–10	6th	
1986	Bob Shaw	13–12	1–9	6th	
1987	Bob Shaw	10–15	1–9	6th	
1988	Bob Shaw	13–23	3–9	6th	
1989	Bob Shaw	7–34	1–11	T–6th	
1990	Bob Shaw	10–28	3–9	6th	
1991	Charlie Wieners	21–16–1	5–7	5th	
1992	Charlie Wieners	26–15	3–7	5th	
1993	Charlie Wieners	31–16	6–4	T–3rd	
1994	Charlie Wieners	23–17	3–7	5th	
1995	Charlie Wieners	37–16	6–4	3rd	
1996	Charlie Wieners	37–11	7–7	5th	
1997	Charlie Wieners	39–16	12–4	2nd	
1998	Charlie Wieners	35–17	12–4	2nd	
1999	Charlie Wieners	34–27–1	10–6	3rd	
2000	Charlie Wieners	34–15–1	7–7	5th	
2001	Charlie Wieners/Larry Dougherty	21–23–1	12–9	3rd	
2002	Moo Moyer	32–17	12–9	T–3rd	
2003	Moo Moyer	25–15	8–4	3rd	
2004	Moo Moyer	21–29	8–4	3rd	
2005	Moo Moyer	21–23	8–6	T–3rd	
2006	Moo Moyer	13–38–1	4–14	9th	
2007	Terri Adams	13–25	6–12	9th	
2008	Terri Adams	19–23	11–9	5th	
2009	Terri Adams	27–20	9–7	5th	
2010	Terri Adams	29–18	11–7	5th	
2011	Terri Adams	31–16	10–4	3rd	
2012	Terri Adams	22–29–1	9–10–1	6th	
2013	Terri Adams	37–10–1	17–5	1st	
2014	Terri Adams	22–20	10–6	3rd	
2015	Terri Adams	23–18	8–11	8th	
2016	Terri Adams	25–26–1	10–12–1	5th	
2017	Terri Adams	25–28	14–8	3rd	
2018	Erin Brooks	24–25	11–12	7th	
2019	Erin Brooks	28–25	13–10	5th	
2020	Erin Brooks	4–11	0–0	N/A	Season cut short due to COVID-19 pandemic
2021	Erin Brooks	26–20	19–3	2nd	
2022	Erin Brooks	23–23	14–8	3rd	
2023	Erin Brooks	20–28	10–14	7th	
2024	Gina McCool	0–0	0–0		
Total:		918–813–8 (.530)			
National champion Postseason invitational champion Conference regular season champion Conference regular season and conference tournament champion Division regular season champion Division regular season and conference tournament champion Conference tournament champion

== See also ==
- List of NCAA Division I softball programs
