= Center for Global Citizenship =

Cultural center in St. Louis, Missouri

Coordinates: 38.6360478°N 90.2362919°W

- CGC
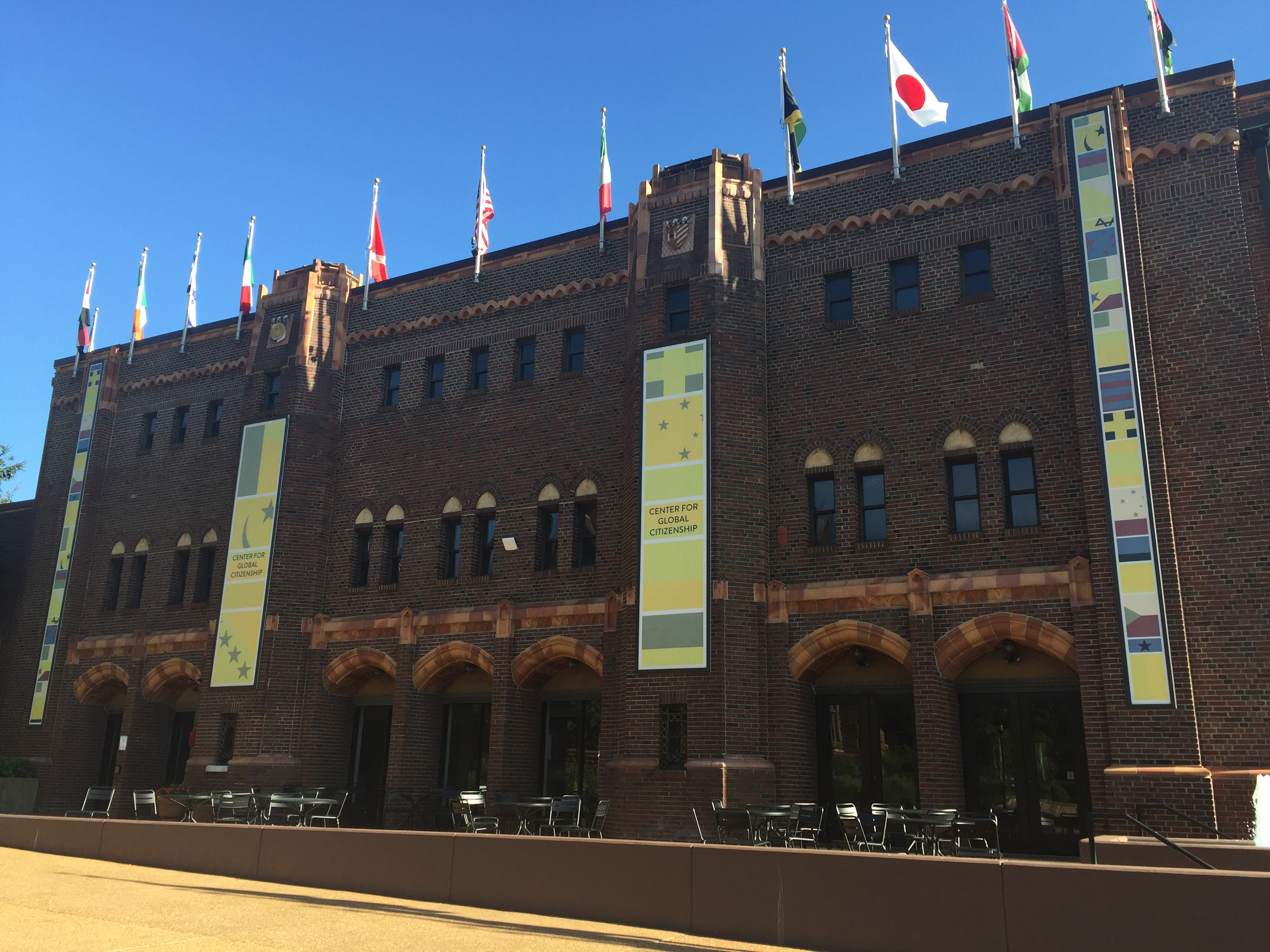
- Interactive map of Center for Global Citizenship
- Former names: Bauman-Eberhardt Center; West Pine Gym
- Address: St. Louis, MO; United States
- Owner: Saint Louis University
- Operator: Saint Louis University
- Capacity: 2,220
- Current use: Cultural center
- Public transit: MetroBus

Tenants
- Saint Louis Billikens women's basketball (1920–2008); Saint Louis Billikens men's basketball (1926–1945)

Website
- SLU Center for Global Citizenship

The Center for Global Citizenship (CGC), previously known as the Bauman–Eberhardt Center and the West Pine Gym, is a multi-purpose cultural center in St. Louis, Missouri. The building initially opened in 1920 as an arena, and was used for this purpose by Saint Louis University until Chaifetz Arena finished construction in 2008. After extensive renovation, the building became the Center for Global Citizenship in the fall of 2013.

It was home of the Saint Louis University Billikens men's basketball team until the Kiel Auditorium opened in 1934. The building also hosted the Saint Louis University Billikens women's basketball team from 1920 to 2008. which played its final season at that facility during the 2007–2008 season. After that, the program moved into the new Chaifetz Arena at the start of the 2008–2009 season.

The building is now home to SLU's Center of Global Citizenship, which opened in 2013.
