= George Washington Revolutionaries softball =

College softball team

George Washington Revolutionaries
- University: George Washington University
- Head coach: Matthew Klampert (1st season)
- Conference: Atlantic 10
- Home stadium: Mount Vernon Softball Field
- Nickname: Revolutionaries
- Colors: Buff and blue

NCAA Tournament appearances
- 2021

Conference tournament championships
- 2021

Regular-season conference championships
- 2021, 2022

The George Washington Revolutionaries softball team represents George Washington University in the NCAA Division I college softball. The team participates in the Atlantic 10 Conference (A-10). The Revolutionaries are currently led by head coach Matthew Klampert. The team plays its home games at Mount Vernon Softball Field, which is located on the university's campus.

== History ==
The Revolutionaries have achieved some success since the 2021 season, winning the Atlantic 10 Conference regular season championship in 2021 and in 2022. The program won the Atlantic 10 Conference Tournament in 2021 after defeating Dayton in two games. By winning the tournament, George Washington qualified for the first NCAA Division I softball tournament in program history and were placed in the Baton Rouge Super Regional. The Revolutionaries were defeated by Louisiana in their first game, losing 1-0 in extra innings. They were eliminated from the tournament by McNeese State, losing via the mercy rule in five innings.

=== George Washington in the NCAA Tournament ===
Year	Record	Pct	Notes
2021	0–2	.000	Baton Rouge Regional
TOTALS	0-2	.000	

=== Coaching history ===
Years	Coach	Record	%
2003	Leslie King-Moore	3–36	.077
2004	Shaunte' Fremin	1–5–1	.214
2005–2006	JoAnne Ferguson	34–62	.354
2007–2010	Kim Staehle	57–126	.311
2011–2016	Stacey Schramm	134–163–2	.452
2017–2018	James DeFeo	61–45	.575
2019–2021	Shane Winkler	91–43	.679
2022–2024	Chrissy Schoonmaker	53–45	.541
2025–present	Matthew Klampert	0-0	

== Roster ==
2026 George Washington Revolutionaries roster
Pitchers: 11 – Chloe Greene – Senior; 94 – Emma Fales – Senior; 95 – Cece Smith – Junior; 20 – Sophia Torreso – Junior; Catchers: 25 – Lucy Goodwin – Graduate Student; 21 – Isabella Ruby – Freshman; Outfielders: 5 – Ashley Corpuz – Senior; 29 – Paige Hayward – Junior; 19 – Katie Hendrickson – Sophomore	Infielders: 23 – Daniella Lew – Senior; 51 – Cadence Gilliland – Junior; 13 – Kaylee Layfield – Sophomore; 7 – Emi Todoroki – Sophomore; 2 – Reese Ferrel – Freshman; 3 – Jazlene Ramos – Freshman; 10 – Sydney Hogue – Freshman

== Season-by-season results ==
Record table
Season	Coach	Overall	Conference	Standing	Postseason
George Washington Colonials (Atlantic 10 Conference) (2003–2003)
2003	Leslie King-Moore	3–36	0–16	9th	
George Washington Colonials (Independent) (2004–2004)
2004	Shaunte' Fremin	1–5–1			
George Washington Colonials/Revolutionaries (Atlantic 10 Conference) (2005–present)
2005	JoAnne Ferguson	10–34	5–9	6th	
2006	JoAnne Ferguson	24–28	3–15	10th	
2007	Kim Staehle	23–27	9–11	6th	
2008	Kim Staehle	12–27	8–10	7th	
2009	Kim Staehle	16–33	6–14	10th	
2010	Kim Staehle	6–39	3–17	10th	
2011	Stacey Schramm	16–27–1	6–14	9th	
2012	Stacey Schramm	25–30	11–9	4th	
2013	Stacey Schramm	27–23	13–7	4th	
2014	Stacey Schramm	18–31–1	4–12	10th	
2015	Stacey Schramm	25–23	7–14	9th	
2016	Stacey Schramm	23–29	10–13	6th	
2017	James DeFeo	28–24	11–12	7th	
2018	James DeFeo	33–21	12–11	6th	
2019	Shane Winkler	44–18	15–7	3rd	
2020	Shane Winkler	10–14	0–0	N/A	Season cut short due to COVID-19 pandemic
2021	Shane Winkler	37–11	23–1	1st	NCAA Regionals
2022	Chrissy Schoonmaker	36–17	21–3	1st	
2023	Chrissy Schoonmaker	17–28	7–19	9th	
2024	Chrissy Schoonmaker	0–0	0–0		
Total:		434–525–3 (.453)			
National champion Postseason invitational champion Conference regular season champion Conference regular season and conference tournament champion Division regular season champion Division regular season and conference tournament champion Conference tournament champion

== See also ==
- List of NCAA Division I softball programs
