= Sortino Field =

Softball field in Massachusetts, USA

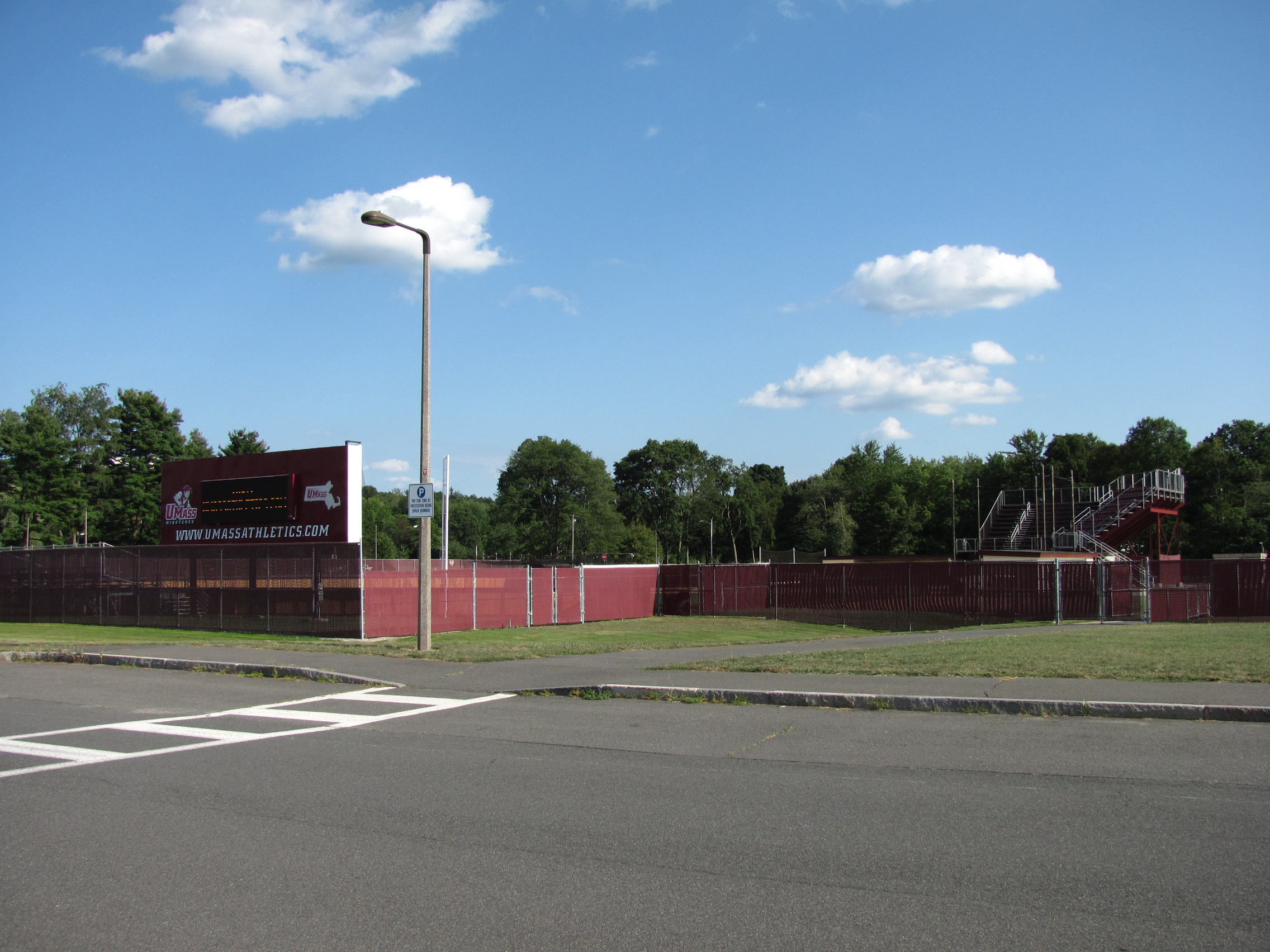
- Sortino Field in 2010
- Interactive map of Sortino Field
- Location: Amherst, Massachusetts 01003
- Coordinates: 42°22′58″N 72°32′5.5″W
- Owner: University of Massachusetts Amherst
- Capacity: 1,000
- Surface: Grass

Construction
- Opened: 2000

Tenant
- University of Massachusetts Amherst

Sortino Field is a college softball stadium on the campus of the University of Massachusetts Amherst in Amherst, Massachusetts. From 2000 until 2012, the facility was known as UMass Softball Complex. It was renamed in 2012 to honor longtime UMass softball coach Elaine Sortino. It has served as the home of the University of Massachusetts Minutewoman softball team since the spring of 2000.

The field officially opened on April 1, 2000, when UMass posted a 5–2 victory over Princeton. Among the facilities available at Sortino Field are two batting cages, a bullpen that can accommodate three pitchers, heated dugouts, lockers in the UMass dugout and dugout restrooms. The surface also features a state-of-the-art drainage system which can accommodate six inches of rain per hour.

Each year the complex typically hosts the NCAA national softball tournament Amherst Regional.
