= Saint Louis Billikens softball =

College softball team

Saint Louis Billikens
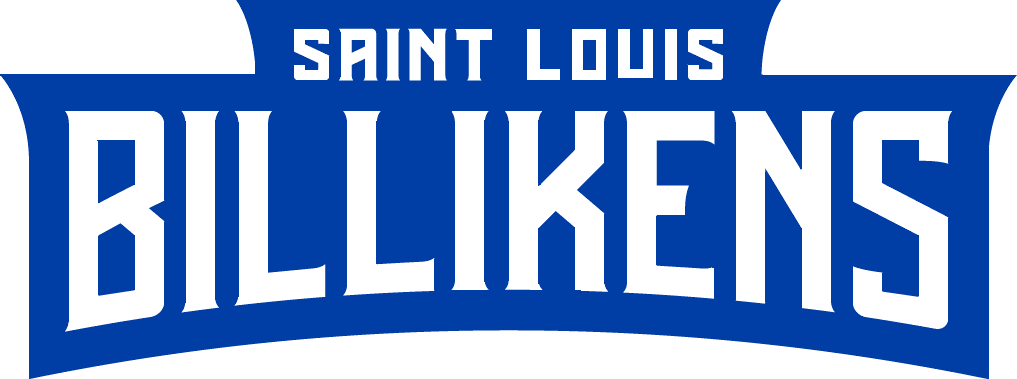
- University: Saint Louis University
- Head coach: Christy Connoyer (16th season)
- Conference: Atlantic 10
- Location: St. Louis, Missouri, US
- Home stadium: Billiken Sports Center (capacity: 500)
- Nickname: Billikens
- Colors: SLU blue and white

NCAA Tournament appearances
- 2025

Conference tournament championships
- 2025

Regular-season conference championships
- 2023

The Saint Louis Billikens softball is the team that represents Saint Louis University in the NCAA Division I college softball. The team currently competes in the Atlantic 10 Conference (A-10).

From 1987 until 1991, the team was a member of the Midwestern Collegiate Conference. From 2000 until 2005, the team was a member of the Conference USA (C-USA). The Billikens are now currently led by their head coach Christy Connoyer. The team plays its home games at Billiken Sports Center which is located on the university's campus.

== History ==
The Billikens have been a member of the Atlantic 10 Conference since 2006. The team won their first regular season championship in 2023 after finishing the season with a 30–26 record, one of the best records in program history. However, the team has failed to win the Atlantic 10 Conference tournament, subsequently failing to qualify for the NCAA Division I softball tournament. Since forming a team in 1978, the Billikens have failed to advance to the tournament.

The team's playing field, Billiken Sports Center, was built in 2000 and originally did not feature dugouts. Prior to the building of the softball field, the team was essentially a homeless travel team, playing in several different "home" fields in the St. Louis area, including Forest Park, ABC Ballpark, and the Affton Athletic Association fields.

In 2010, the program hired former Southern Illinois assistant coach Christy Connoyer as its head coach. Connoyer was named Atlantic 10 Coach of the Year in 2023, the program's first such award. Pitcher Brianna Lore was named Atlantic 10 Co-Pitcher of the Year in 2014, sharing the award with Fordham's Michele Daubman.

=== Coaching history ===
Years	Coach	Record	%
1978–1981	Vicki Schneider	55–61–1	.474
1982	Steve Curran	12–24	.333
1983–1985	Suzanna Tillotson	19–70	.213
1986–1988	Sandy Smith	56–68–1	.452
1989–1990	Barbara Hibbeler	27–36–1	.430
1991	Katie Weismiller	12–35	.255
1992–1996	Denise Swanger	27–182	.129
1997–2006	Jim Molloy	142–362–1	.282
2007–2010	John Conway	104–125–2	.455
2011–present	Christy Connoyer	410–400	.506

== Roster ==
2024 Saint Louis Billikens roster
Pitchers: 45 – Anna Christ – Freshman; 24 – Taylor Hochman – Junior; 12 – Isabel Royle – Freshman; 22 – Lily Strand – Freshman; Catchers: 16 – Kelsey Etling – Graduate Student; 13 – Abby Mallo – Sophomore	Infielders: 20 – Jocelyn Abbott – Senior; 7 – Sophia Boente – Freshman; 2 – Kendall Johnson – Junior; 18 – Jane Kaniecki – Junior; 1 – Chloe Rhine – Sophomore; 23 – Abby Ulsas – Freshman; Outfielders: 00 – Ashley Marietta – Freshman; 6 – Sydney Ross – Junior; 11 – Natalie Sullivan – Junior; Utility: 21 – Karsen Jany – Freshman; 44 – Allie Marietta – Sophomore; 5 – Cami Newbanks – Graduate Student

== Season-by-season results ==
Record table
Season	Coach	Overall	Conference	Standing	Postseason
Saint Louis Billikens (Independent) (1978–1986)
1978	Vicki Schneider	7–13			
1979	Vicki Schneider	12–8			
1980	Vicki Schneider	23–19			
1981	Vicki Schneider	13–21–1			
1982	Steve Curran	12–24			
1983	Suzanna Tillotson	5–26			
1984	Suzanna Tillotson	11–16			
1985	Suzanna Tillotson	3–28			
1986	Sandy Smith	19–21–1			
Saint Louis Billikens (Midwestern Collegiate Conference) (1987–1991)
1987	Sandy Smith	24–21			
1988	Sandy Smith	13–27			
1989	Barb Hibbeler	16–19			
1990	Barb Hibbeler	11–17–1			
1991	Katie Weismiller	12–35			
Saint Louis Billikens (Independent) (1992–1999)
1992	Denise Swanger	4–30			
1993	Denise Swanger	14–24			
1994	Denise Swanger	2–38			
1995	Denise Swanger	1–45			
1996	Denise Swanger	6–45			
1997	Jim Molloy	1–39			
1998	Jim Molloy	5–46			
1999	Jim Molloy	4–46			
Saint Louis Billikens (Conference USA) (2000–2005)
2000	Jim Molloy	9–43	3–14	6th	
2001	Jim Molloy	25–34	5–16	7th	
2002	Jim Molloy	24–27	5–17	9th	
2003	Jim Molloy	21–18	9–14	7th	
2004	Jim Molloy	16–45	1–23	9th	
2005	Jim Molloy	18–31–1	4–20	T–8th	
Saint Louis Billikens (Atlantic 10 Conference) (2006–present)
2006	Jim Molloy	19–33	8–12	T–6th	
2007	John Conway	29–33	11–8	3rd	
2008	John Conway	23–33–1	11–9	6th	
2009	John Conway	22–33	12–6	3rd	
2010	John Conway	30–26–1	12–7–1	4th	
2011	Christy Connoyer	29–24	10–8	7th	
2012	Christy Connoyer	23–33	9–11	9th	
2013	Christy Connoyer	28–23	13–9	5th	
2014	Christy Connoyer	30–21	12–5	2nd	
2015	Christy Connoyer	36–18	18–5	2nd	
2016	Christy Connoyer	25–26	14–8	4th	
2017	Christy Connoyer	25–25	12–10	5th	
2018	Christy Connoyer	28–29	11–10	5th	
2019	Christy Connoyer	19–33	12–10	6th	
2020	Christy Connoyer	8–13	0–0	N/A	Season cut short due to COVID-19 pandemic
2021	Christy Connoyer	19–27	10–12	6th	
2022	Christy Connoyer	22–29	13–10	4th	
2023	Christy Connoyer	30–26	20–6	1st	
2024	Christy Connoyer	31-22	16-10	3rd	
2025	Christy Connoyer	34-24	18-7	2nd	Fayettville Regional (0-2)
2026	Christy Connoyer	23-28	13-10	2nd	
Total:		864–1,364–6 (.388)			
National champion Postseason invitational champion Conference regular season champion Conference regular season and conference tournament champion Division regular season champion Division regular season and conference tournament champion Conference tournament champion

== See also ==
- List of NCAA Division I softball programs
