= 2021 Atlantic 10 Conference softball tournament =

American college softball tournament

- Teams: 4
- Format: Double-elimination tournament
- Finals site: SJU Softball Field; Merion Station, Pennsylvania
- Champions: George Washington
- Television: ESPN+

The 2021 Atlantic 10 Conference softball tournament was held at the SJU Softball Field on the campus of Saint Joseph's University in Merion Station, Pennsylvania from May 13 through May 15, 2021. The tournament winners, George Washington, earned the Atlantic 10 Conference's automatic bid to the 2021 NCAA Division I softball tournament

== Tournament ==
=== Bracket ===
Thursday, May 13
1	George Washington	0
4	Dayton	2
Winner's bracket
2	Saint Joseph's	3
3	Fordham	7
1	George Washington	8
2	Saint Joseph's	0
Loser's bracket

Friday, May 14
4	Dayton	7
3	Fordham	1
1	George Washington	8
3	Fordham	1

Saturday, May 15
4	Dayton	2	2
1	George Washington	3	7
