= NCAA Division I softball tournament =

Annual softball tournament

- Current season, competition or edition: 2026 NCAA Division I softball season
- Sport: College softball
- Founded: 1982
- No. of teams: 64
- Most recent champion: Texas (2nd title)
- Most titles: UCLA (12)
- Broadcasters: ESPN; ESPN2
- Website: NCAA.com

The NCAA Division I softball tournament is held annually in May/June and features 64 college softball teams in the United States, culminating in the Women's College World Series (WCWS), which is played in Oklahoma City.

== Tournament play and team selection ==
The tournament is different from many college tournaments in that it features four tiers of competition and a loss does not necessarily eliminate a team from contention. In fact, throughout the entire tournament a team can lose as many as four games and still be crowned champions.

A total of 64 teams compete in the tournament. 32 teams gain automatic entry into the tournament while the other 32 are selected by the Division I Softball committee. From this field of 64, 16 teams will be given "national seeds" and placed at one of the assigned regional sites, often the home field of each national seed.

The first round of the tournament, called "regionals", consists of 16 locations that include four teams competing in a double elimination bracket. The winner of each regional moves on to the second round, the "super regionals."

For the super regionals, the regional containing overall #1 seed will be matched up with the regional containing the overall #16 seed, the #2 seed regional will be matched up with the #15 seed regional, and so on. The higher seed of the two teams usually hosts the best-of-three series, with the winner moving on to the Women's College World Series.

The final eight teams meet at Devon Park in Oklahoma City in the Women's College World Series. The WCWS is further divided into two sections. The first part resembles the regional round, as teams are broken in two groups of four to play in a double-elimination bracket. The winners of each bracket then meet in a championship series similar to the super regional tier in that it is a best-of-three series. The winner of the WCWS is crowned national champion.

== Team titles ==
Schools that have won the NCAA Championship
12, 8, 2, 1

Team	No.	Years
UCLA	12	1982, 1984, 1985, 1988, 1989, 1990, 1992, ~~1995~~, 1999, 2003, 2004, 2010, 2019
Arizona	8	1991, 1993, 1994, 1996, 1997, 2001, 2006, 2007
Oklahoma	8	2000, 2013, 2016, 2017, 2021, 2022, 2023, 2024
Texas	2	2025, 2026
Florida	2	2014, 2015
Arizona State	2	2008, 2011
Texas A&M	2	1983, 1987
Florida State	1	2018
Alabama	1	2012
Washington	1	2009
Michigan	1	2005
California	1	2002
Fresno State	1	1998
Cal State Fullerton	1	1986

== Appearances by team ==
Total columns

- School refers to the current name and branding of the softball team.
- Conference reflects each team's affiliation as of the 2027 season.
- # Total appearances in the NCAA Tournament, not counting vacated appearances.
- 16 Finished in the top 16 of the tournament: top 2 in a Regional (1982 through 2004) or won a Regional (2005 to present).
- WS Total appearances in the College World Series
- CH National Championships

Table entries

- CH National Champion
- RU National Runner-up
- W^{3} W^{4} W^{5} W^{7} Played in the College World Series with the given placement. All World Series have had 2 teams finish in 5th and two teams finish in 7th. Since 1995, all have had 2 teams finish in 3rd, but before then, some years would have separate 3rd and 4th place teams, depending on how the bracket played out.

1982 to 2004

- Regional tournaments consisted of 2 to 8 teams in double elimination brackets. Depending on how the tournament played out, there could be two teams tying for 3rd, 5th, or 7th place.
- R_{2} 2nd place in Regional tournament
- R_{3} 3rd place in Regional tournament
- R• 4th place in Regional tournament
- R◦ 5th or 6th place in Regional tournament
- R◦ 7th or 8th place in Regional tournament (only 2003 and 2004)

2005 to present

- All regional tournaments consist of 4-team double elimination brackets, with distinct placements for every team. The 16 Regional winners faced off in Super Regionals, with 8 winners advancing to the College World Series.
- SR Lost in the Super Regionals
- R_{2} 2nd place in Regional tournament
- R_{3} 3rd place in Regional tournament
- R• 4th place in Regional tournament

Starting in 2003, the NCAA seeded the top 8 teams, which are shown in double underline. Starting in 2005, the next 8 seeds are shown with single underline. These seeded teams are not always the host of the Regional, but in recent years, the list of hosts aligns very closely to the list of top seeds.

School	Conference	#	16	WS	CH	82	83	84	85	86	87	88	89	90	91	92	93	94	95	96	97	98	99	00	01	02	03	04	05	06	07	08	09	10	11	12	13	14	15	16	17	18	19	21	22	23	24	25	26
UCLA	Big Ten	41	36	34	12	CH	W^{3}	CH	CH		RU	CH	CH	CH	RU	CH	RU	W^{3}	~~CH~~	W^{3}	RU		CH	RU	RU	W^{5}	CH	CH	RU	W^{3}	R_{3}	W^{5}	SR	CH	R_{2}	R•	R_{2}	SR	W^{5}	W^{7}	W^{5}	W^{3}	CH	W^{5}	W^{3}	R•	W^{5}	W^{5}	W^{5}
Arizona	Big 12	39	35	25	8			R_{2}			R_{2}	W^{3}	W^{3}	W^{7}	CH	RU	CH	CH	RU	CH	CH	RU	W^{5}	W^{3}	CH	RU	W^{3}	R_{3}	W^{5}	CH	CH	W^{7}	W^{7}	RU	SR	SR	R_{3}	SR	SR	SR	SR	SR	W^{5}	W^{7}	W^{5}		SR	R_{2}	R_{2}
Oklahoma	SEC	32	28	18	8													R_{2}	R_{2}	R_{2}	R_{3}	R_{2}	R◦	CH	W^{5}	W^{7}	W^{5}	W^{5}	SR	R_{2}	SR	SR	R_{3}	SR	W^{7}	RU	CH	W^{5}	SR	CH	CH	W^{3}	RU	CH	CH	CH	CH	W^{3}	SR
Florida	SEC	26	17	13	2																	R•		R_{3}	R•		R◦	R◦	R•	R_{3}	SR	W^{3}	RU	W^{5}	RU	R_{2}	W^{5}	CH	CH	SR	RU	W^{5}	W^{7}	SR	W^{5}	R_{2}	W^{3}	W^{7}	SR
Arizona State	Big 12	33	21	12	2	W^{3}			R_{2}		W^{7}		R_{2}	R_{2}	R_{2}		R_{2}				R_{3}	R_{3}	W^{7}	R_{2}	R_{3}	W^{3}	R•		R_{3}	W^{5}	W^{7}	CH	W^{5}	SR	CH	W^{3}	W^{7}	R_{2}	R_{2}	R_{2}	R_{3}	W^{7}	R_{2}	R_{3}	SR			R•	SR
Texas	SEC	27	13	9	2																	W^{7}	R◦	R•		R•	W^{3}		W^{3}	W^{5}	R_{2}	R_{3}	R_{2}	R_{3}	R_{3}	SR	W^{3}	R_{2}	R_{3}	R_{3}	R_{2}	R_{3}	SR	SR	RU	SR	RU	CH	CH
Texas A&M	SEC	36	18	8	2		CH	RU	R_{2}	RU	CH	W^{5}		R_{3}	R_{2}			R_{2}		R•			R•	R◦		R_{2}	R_{2}	R◦	SR	R_{3}	W^{7}	RU	R_{3}	R_{2}	SR	R_{2}	SR	R_{2}	R_{2}	R_{2}	W^{7}	SR	R•	R_{3}	R_{2}	R_{2}	SR	R_{2}	R_{2}
Alabama	SEC	27	23	16	1																		R◦	W^{5}	R_{3}	R◦	W^{7}	R_{2}	W^{5}	W^{7}	SR	W^{3}	W^{3}	SR	W^{3}	CH	SR	RU	W^{5}	W^{7}	SR	SR	W^{3}	W^{3}	R_{2}	W^{7}	W^{5}	SR	W^{3}
Washington	Big Ten	32	24	15	1													R_{3}	R_{2}	RU	W^{3}	W^{3}	RU	W^{5}	R_{2}	R_{3}	W^{5}	W^{7}	SR	SR	W^{3}	R_{2}	CH	W^{7}	SR	SR	W^{3}	SR	R_{2}	SR	W^{3}	RU	W^{3}	SR	R_{2}	W^{5}	R_{3}	R_{3}	R_{3}
Florida State	ACC	38	24	12	1					R_{2}	W^{7}	R_{3}	R_{3}	W^{3}	W^{5}	W^{7}	W^{7}	R•	R_{2}	R_{2}		R•		R_{2}	R_{2}	W^{3}	R◦	W^{5}	R_{2}	SR	R•	R_{3}	R_{3}	R_{3}	R_{2}	R_{3}	SR	W^{7}	SR	W^{3}	SR	CH	SR	RU	R_{2}	RU	SR	SR	R_{2}
California	ACC	36	24	12	1	R_{2}				W^{3}	R_{2}	R_{2}	R_{2}	R_{2}	R_{2}	W^{5}	R_{2}	R_{3}	R_{3}	W^{5}	R_{2}	R_{3}	W^{3}	W^{7}	W^{5}	CH	RU	RU	W^{7}	SR	R_{3}	SR	SR	SR	W^{5}	W^{3}	R_{2}		R_{3}	R_{2}	R_{2}	R_{3}				R_{2}	R_{3}	R_{2}	
Michigan	Big Ten	31	21	12	1											R_{2}	R_{2}		W^{7}	W^{7}	W^{5}	W^{5}	R◦	R_{2}	W^{7}	W^{7}		W^{7}	CH	SR	SR	SR	W^{5}	SR	R_{2}	SR	W^{5}	SR	RU	W^{5}	R_{2}	R_{3}	R_{2}	R_{2}	R_{2}		R_{2}	R_{3}	R_{2}
Fresno State	Pac-12	34	19	12	1	RU	R_{2}	W^{5}	R_{2}	R_{2}	W^{5}	RU	RU	RU	W^{3}	W^{3}	R_{2}	W^{5}	R_{2}	R_{2}	W^{3}	CH	W^{5}	R_{2}	R◦	R•	R_{3}	R◦	R_{2}	R_{2}	R_{3}	R_{2}	R_{2}	R_{2}	R_{3}				R•	R_{3}	R_{3}			R_{3}					
Cal State Fullerton	Big West	33	18	6	1	W^{3}	RU	R_{2}	W^{3}	CH	W^{3}	R_{2}	R_{2}	R_{2}	R_{2}	R_{2}	R_{2}	R_{2}	W^{5}	R_{2}			R_{3}	R◦	R_{2}	R_{2}	R•		R_{2}	R_{3}	SR	R•	R_{3}							R_{2}	R_{2}	R_{2}	R•		R_{3}	R_{3}	R_{2}		R_{3}
Oklahoma State	Big 12	28	19	12	-	W^{7}		R_{2}				R_{2}	W^{3}	W^{3}	R_{2}	R_{2}	W^{4}	W^{3}	R_{3}	R_{2}	R_{2}	W^{3}					R_{3}		R_{2}				R_{2}	R_{3}	W^{7}					R_{2}	R_{2}	R_{3}	W^{5}	W^{5}	W^{3}	W^{5}	W^{7}	R_{2}	SR
Tennessee	SEC	24	15	10	-																		R◦				R◦	R•	W^{3}	W^{3}	RU	R_{2}	R_{2}	W^{3}	R_{2}	W^{7}	RU	SR	W^{7}	R_{2}	SR	SR	SR	R_{3}	R_{2}	W^{3}	SR	W^{3}	W^{3}
Nebraska	Big Ten	28	14	8	-	W^{5}		W^{3}	~~RU~~		W^{3}	W^{5}							R_{3}	R_{3}	R_{2}	W^{5}	R_{2}	R_{2}	R_{3}	W^{5}	R_{3}	R_{2}	R_{3}	R_{2}	R•		R_{3}	R_{3}	R_{2}		W^{7}	SR	R_{3}	R_{2}					R_{3}	R_{2}		SR	W^{5}
Oregon	Big Ten	26	16	7	-								W^{5}	R_{3}				R_{2}				R_{2}	R_{3}	R_{3}			R_{2}	R_{2}	R_{2}		R_{2}	R_{2}		SR	SR	W^{5}	SR	W^{3}	W^{7}	SR	W^{3}	W^{5}		R_{2}	R_{2}	SR	R_{2}	W^{5}	R_{3}
Louisiana	Sun Belt	33	19	6	-									R_{2}	R_{3}	R_{2}	W^{3}	R_{2}	W^{5}	W^{5}	R_{2}		R_{2}	R•	R_{2}	R•	W^{7}	R_{2}	R_{3}	R_{2}	R•	W^{5}	R_{2}	SR	R_{2}	SR	SR	W^{7}	SR	SR	R_{2}	R_{2}	R_{2}	R_{2}	R_{2}	SR	R_{2}		
LSU	SEC	27	16	6	-																	R_{2}	R_{3}	R_{2}	W^{3}	R_{2}	R◦	W^{3}		SR	SR	R_{2}	R_{2}	R_{3}	R_{2}	W^{5}	R_{2}	R_{2}	W^{3}	W^{3}	W^{5}	SR	SR	SR	R•	R_{2}	SR	R_{3}	SR
Missouri	SEC	27	15	6	-	R_{2}	W^{7}								W^{5}			W^{7}	R•		R•		R_{2}				R◦	R◦	R_{2}		R_{2}	SR	W^{7}	W^{7}	W^{5}	SR	SR	R_{2}	SR	SR	R•	R_{2}	R_{2}	SR	R_{2}	R_{3}	SR		
Northwestern	Big Ten	23	11	6	-			W^{3}	W^{5}	W^{7}	R_{2}													R_{3}			R◦	R•	SR	RU	W^{3}	SR	R•			R_{2}		R_{2}	R•	R_{3}		R_{2}	SR	R_{3}	W^{7}	SR	R_{2}	R_{3}	
Georgia	SEC	24	16	5	-																					R_{3}	R•	R_{2}	SR	R_{2}	R_{2}	SR	W^{3}	W^{3}	SR	SR	R_{2}	SR	SR	W^{5}	R_{2}	W^{7}	R_{2}	W^{7}	R_{2}	SR	SR	SR	SR
Long Beach State	Big West	26	8	5	-					W^{5}	R_{2}	R_{2}	R_{2}	W^{5}	W^{4}	W^{5}	W^{7}			R_{3}	R_{3}	R_{3}	R_{3}	R◦			R◦	R_{3}	R•	R_{3}		R_{3}	R_{3}		R_{3}	R_{3}		R_{3}		R_{3}		R_{3}		R•		R•			
Stanford	ACC	23	11	4	-																	R_{2}	R◦	R◦	W^{3}	R_{3}	R◦	W^{3}	SR	SR	R_{2}	SR	SR	R_{3}	SR	R_{2}	R_{2}						R_{3}	R_{2}	SR	W^{3}	W^{3}	R_{2}	R_{2}
Utah	Big 12	17	10	4	-			R_{2}	W^{7}		R_{2}				W^{7}	R_{2}		W^{5}	R•		R_{3}			R_{2}		R◦		R◦		R_{2}									R_{2}	SR	SR					W^{7}	R_{3}		
Cal Poly Pomona	defunct	8	8	4	-	R_{2}	R_{2}	W^{7}	W^{4}	R_{2}	R_{2}	W^{3}	W^{5}																																				
DePaul	Big East	21	7	4	-													R•	R•		R_{2}	R_{2}	W^{3}	W^{7}	R_{3}	R_{2}	R_{3}	R◦	W^{7}		W^{5}	R_{2}	R_{2}	R_{3}	R_{2}	R_{3}		R_{2}			R•	R•	R_{3}						
Baylor	Big 12	17	7	4	-																							R_{3}	SR	R_{2}	W^{5}		SR		W^{3}	R_{3}	R_{2}	W^{3}	R_{2}	R_{2}	W^{7}	R_{2}		R•		R_{3}	SR		R_{2}
Iowa	Big Ten	16	6	4	-								R_{3}		R_{2}		R_{3}		W^{3}	W^{3}	W^{5}	R_{3}		R_{3}	W^{7}	R•	R_{2}	R◦	R_{2}	R•		R_{2}	R•																
South Carolina	SEC	26	10	3	-	R_{2}	W^{4}					R_{2}	W^{7}					R_{3}	R_{3}	R_{2}	W^{7}		R_{3}	R_{3}	R◦	R_{2}	R_{3}	R◦			SR						R_{2}	R_{3}	R_{3}	R_{2}	R_{2}	SR	R_{2}			R_{2}	R_{2}	SR	R_{2}
Louisiana Tech	Sun Belt	11	7	3	-		W^{5}	R_{2}	W^{7}	W^{7}	R_{2}	R_{2}	R_{2}						R•													R_{2}									R_{3}		R_{3}						
UMass	MAC	21	6	3	-					R_{2}			R_{3}		R_{2}	W^{3}			R•	R_{3}	W^{7}	W^{7}	R_{3}	R◦	R_{3}	R_{3}	R_{3}	R◦	R•	SR	R_{2}	R_{2}	R_{2}	R•		R•													
Adelphi	D2	6	6	3	-	R_{2}		W^{5}	W^{5}		R_{2}	W^{7}		R_{2}																																			
UNLV	Mountain West	9	5	3	-									W^{5}	W^{7}	R_{3}	R_{2}	R_{2}	W^{3}	R•									R_{3}				R•																
Oregon State	Pac-12	15	6	2	-																		R_{2}	R_{2}	R•	R_{3}	R_{2}	R_{2}	R_{2}	W^{7}	R_{2}					R_{2}	R_{3}			R•	R•	R_{2}			W^{7}				
Creighton	Big East	12	5	2	-	W^{7}				W^{5}		R_{2}	R_{2}	R_{2}									R◦				R◦	R_{3}	R•		R_{3}	R•		R•															
Cal State Northridge	Big West	14	4	2	-											R_{2}	W^{5}	RU	R_{2}	R_{3}	R•	R•	R•	R◦	R•		R◦	R•			R•								R•										
Indiana	Big Ten	11	4	2	-		W^{7}		R_{2}	W^{3}								R_{2}		R_{3}										R_{3}					R•											R_{2}	R•	R_{3}	R_{3}
Auburn	SEC	20	3	2	-																					R◦		R◦	R_{3}	R_{2}		R_{3}	R_{3}	R_{3}	R_{3}	R•		R_{2}	W^{3}	RU	SR	R_{3}	R_{2}	R•	R_{3}	R_{2}	R_{2}	R_{2}	
Texas Tech	Big 12	8	3	2	-																		R_{2}		R•									R_{2}	R_{2}	R_{3}							R_{2}					RU	RU
Princeton	Ivy League	13	2	2	-													R_{3}	W^{7}	W^{7}						R◦	R◦		R_{3}	R•		R•								R•	R•				R•		R_{3}		R_{3}
Southern Miss	Sun Belt	4	2	2	-																		W^{7}	W^{3}	R◦			R◦																					
Kentucky	SEC	16	8	1	-																												R_{2}	R_{3}	SR	R_{3}	SR	W^{5}	SR	R_{2}	SR	SR	SR	SR	R_{2}	R_{3}	R_{3}	R_{2}	
Pacific	West Coast	13	7	1	-	R_{2}	W^{5}	R_{2}	R_{2}	R_{2}												R_{2}	R•		R_{2}	R◦	R◦	R•			R_{2}				R•														
Central Michigan	MAC	14	6	1	-		R_{2}		R_{2}	R_{2}	W^{5}				R_{2}			R•		R_{3}	R_{2}		R◦	R_{3}	R•	R•		R◦									R•												
Kansas	Big 12	13	6	1	-		R_{2}		R_{2}	R_{2}						W^{7}	R_{2}	R_{3}			R_{2}		R_{3}						R_{3}	R_{2}								R_{3}	R_{2}										R_{3}
Arkansas	SEC	15	5	1	-																			R•		R_{3}						R_{3}	R•			R_{2}	R_{2}				R•	SR	R•	SR	SR	R_{2}	R_{3}	SR	W^{7}
Hawaii	Mountain West	11	5	1	-													R_{2}	R_{2}			R_{3}	R_{2}		R◦		R_{3}				SR	R_{2}		W^{5}		R•	R_{2}												
South Florida	American	19	4	1	-															R_{3}	R_{3}	R_{2}			R_{2}		R◦	R_{3}	R_{2}	SR		R•				W^{7}	R_{2}	R_{2}		R_{3}		R_{3}	R_{3}	R_{2}	R_{3}			R_{3}	R_{2}
UConn	Big East	10	4	1	-								R_{2}	R_{3}	R_{3}	R_{2}	W^{5}		R_{2}	R•					R◦																							R•	R_{3}
Duke	ACC	6	4	1	-																																							R_{2}	SR	SR	W^{7}	R_{2}	SR
Minnesota	Big Ten	17	3	1	-							R_{3}			R_{3}					R•		R_{2}	R_{3}			R_{3}	R◦										R_{3}	SR	R_{2}	R_{2}	R_{2}	R_{2}	W^{7}	R_{2}	R_{3}	R_{3}			
Virginia Tech	ACC	15	3	1	-																								R_{3}	R_{3}	R_{3}	W^{7}				R_{2}	R_{2}	R_{3}	R•				R_{2}	SR	SR	R_{2}	R_{3}	R_{2}	R_{2}
Ole Miss	SEC	10	3	1	-																																			R_{2}	SR	R_{2}	SR	R_{2}	R_{2}	R_{2}	R•	W^{7}	R_{2}
James Madison	Sun Belt	9	3	1	-																												R•				R_{3}	R_{3}	R_{3}	SR	R_{2}	R_{3}	SR	W^{3}					
Mississippi State	SEC	20	2	1	-																			R_{3}		R◦	R◦	R◦	R_{2}		R_{3}	R_{3}	R•			R•	R_{3}	R_{3}	R_{3}		R•	R_{2}	R_{2}	R_{2}	SR		R_{3}	R_{2}	W^{7}
Western Michigan	MAC	4	2	1	-	W^{5}		R_{2}																			R◦								R•														
Utah State	Pac-12	4	2	1	-			W^{7}					R_{3}			R_{3}	R_{2}																																
UIC	Missouri Valley	12	1	1	-													W^{7}	R_{3}			R_{3}	R_{3}	R_{3}	R◦	R◦		R_{3}							R•						R_{3}	R•		R•					
Kent State	MAC	4	1	1	-									W^{7}																R_{3}		R_{2}									R_{3}								
Toledo	MAC	3	1	1	-								W^{7}			R_{3}																											R•						
Northern Illinois	Horizon	2	1	1	-							W^{7}								R_{3}																													
Notre Dame	ACC	27	3	-	-													R_{3}	R_{2}	R•			R•	R◦	R_{2}	R_{2}	R•	R◦	R_{2}	R_{2}	R_{3}	R_{3}	R_{2}	R_{2}	R_{3}	R_{2}	R•	R_{2}	R_{2}	R_{2}	R_{3}	R_{2}	R_{3}	R_{2}	R_{3}	R_{3}			
Ohio State	Big Ten	13	3	-	-									R_{2}												R_{2}		R◦		R_{3}	R_{2}		SR	R_{2}						R_{3}	R•	R_{2}	R_{3}		R_{3}			R_{2}	
Clemson	ACC	6	3	-	-																																							R_{2}	SR	SR	R_{3}	SR	R_{2}
Hofstra	CAA	18	2	-	-												R_{3}		R_{3}				R◦	R◦	R◦		R•	R_{2}	R_{2}	R_{3}	R_{3}	R_{2}		R_{2}		SR	R_{2}	R_{3}	R_{3}			R_{3}				R•			
San Diego State	Pac-12	15	2	-	-																				R_{2}		R◦			R_{2}		R_{3}	R•	R_{3}	R_{2}	R_{2}	R_{3}	R_{3}	R_{2}						R_{2}	SR	R•	R_{3}	
Georgia Tech	ACC	14	2	-	-																					R_{2}	R•	R_{3}	R_{2}	R_{2}	R_{3}	R_{3}	SR	R_{2}	R_{3}	R_{3}									R_{3}			R•	R_{2}
UCF	Big 12	13	2	-	-																								R_{3}			R_{2}		R_{3}		R•		R_{2}	R_{2}	R_{2}				R_{2}	SR	R_{3}	R_{3}	R_{2}	SR
Penn State	Big Ten	11	2	-	-		R_{2}		R_{2}															R•	R•	R•	R◦		R_{2}	R_{2}	R•				R_{2}												R_{3}		
Houston	Big 12	9	2	-	-																							R◦			R_{2}	SR			SR	R_{3}	R_{3}	R_{3}				R_{3}	R_{2}						
Michigan State	Big Ten	4	2	-	-																R_{3}		R_{2}				R_{2}	R•																					
BYU	Big 12	17	1	-	-																				R◦				R_{3}	R_{3}	R_{2}	R_{2}	R_{3}	SR	R_{2}	R_{2}	R•	R_{3}	R_{3}	R_{3}	R_{2}	R_{3}	R_{3}	R_{2}					
Boston University	Patriot	15	1	-	-															R_{2}						R◦	R◦						R_{2}	R_{3}		R_{3}		R_{3}		R•		R•	R•	R•		R_{3}	R_{3}	R•	R_{3}
Texas State	Pac-12	13	1	-	-																		R◦		R_{3}		R_{2}						R_{3}		R•	R_{3}				R_{3}	R_{3}	R_{3}		R_{3}		R_{3}	R_{2}		R_{3}
Southern Illinois	Missouri Valley	11	1	-	-										R_{3}												R_{2}	R_{3}	R_{3}	R_{3}	R_{3}										R•		R_{3}	R•		R•	R_{2}		
Jacksonville State	CUSA	10	1	-	-															R•												R_{2}	SR	R•	R_{3}		R•			R_{2}	R_{3}	R_{2}							R•
Bethune–Cookman	SWAC	10	1	-	-																			R◦	R◦		R◦	R◦	SR					R•	R•	R•						R•	R•						
North Dakota State	Summit	10	1	-	-																												SR	R•	R•	R_{3}		R_{3}	R_{2}	R_{3}	R_{3}	R_{3}	R•						
Illinois State	Missouri Valley	9	1	-	-							R_{2}							R_{3}					R•	R•					R_{3}	R_{2}			R•	R_{3}	R_{2}													
Liberty	CUSA	8	1	-	-																					R◦									R•							R_{2}		R_{2}	R_{3}	R_{2}	R_{2}	SR	
Illinois	Big Ten	8	1	-	-																						R◦	R_{2}					R•	R_{2}						R_{3}	R_{2}		R_{3}		R•				
Missouri State	CUSA	7	1	-	-		R_{2}													R•	R•	R_{3}								R•					R_{3}										R_{3}				
Wichita State	American	7	1	-	-								R_{2}																R•											R_{3}		R_{2}		R_{2}	R_{3}	R_{3}			
NC State	ACC	5	1	-	-																									R_{3}	R_{3}						R_{2}	R_{2}	SR										
UAB	American	5	1	-	-																													R_{3}	R_{3}	R•	SR	R_{3}											
Bowling Green	MAC	4	1	-	-	R_{2}						R_{3}					R_{3}											R◦																					
San Jose State	Mountain West	4	1	-	-									R_{3}		R_{2}																					R•				R_{3}								
Maryland	Big Ten	4	1	-	-																		R_{2}											R_{3}	R_{3}	R•													
Northern Iowa	Missouri Valley	3	1	-	-									R_{2}																							R_{3}							R_{3}					
Nicholls	Southland	3	1	-	-														R_{3}	R_{2}	R•																												
Colorado State	Pac-12	3	1	-	-																R_{2}						R◦																R_{3}						
Rutgers	Big Ten	2	1	-	-			R_{2}										R•																															
Wyoming	defunct	1	1	-	-	R_{2}																																											
New Mexico	Mountain West	1	1	-	-		R_{2}																																										
Rhode Island	Atlantic 10	1	1	-	-		R_{2}																																										
North Carolina	ACC	16	-	-	-																				R•		R◦	R◦	R_{2}	R•	R_{3}	R•	R_{2}	R_{2}		R_{2}	R_{3}		R_{3}	R_{3}	R_{2}		R_{2}					R•	
Louisville	ACC	16	-	-	-																							R◦	R_{3}	R_{2}	R_{3}	R_{3}	R_{3}	R_{2}	R_{2}	R_{2}	R_{3}	R•	R•	R•			R_{2}			R_{3}			R•
Chattanooga	Southern	13	-	-	-																			R•	R◦	R_{3}	R◦	R◦				R•	R•		R_{2}			R•	R•				R•		R_{3}				
Florida Atlantic	American	11	-	-	-																		R_{3}	R◦	R_{3}	R•	R•	R•		R_{2}									R_{2}	R_{3}							R•	R_{3}	
Lehigh	Patriot	11	-	-	-																				R◦			R◦	R•	R_{2}		R_{3}	R_{2}		R•	R•			R_{3}		R•				R_{3}				
Tulsa	American	11	-	-	-																									R•		R•	R_{2}		R_{2}	R_{3}	R•	R_{2}		R•	R_{2}	R_{3}	R_{2}						
Fordham	Atlantic 10	11	-	-	-																													R_{2}	R_{3}		R_{3}	R•	R_{2}	R•	R_{3}	R•	R•		R•				R•
McNeese	Southland	10	-	-	-													R•											R_{3}					R•						R_{3}	R_{3}	R_{3}		R_{3}	R_{2}	R_{2}			R•
LIU	NEC	10	-	-	-																		R•				R◦	R◦		R•	R_{3}	R•		R_{2}		R•				R•						R•			
Wisconsin	Big Ten	10	-	-	-																				R_{3}	R◦			R•								R_{2}	R_{2}			R_{2}	R_{3}	R_{2}		R_{2}				R_{3}
Canisius	Metro	9	-	-	-													R_{3}						R•		R◦		R◦	R•		R•	R_{3}	R•												R•				
Florida A&M	SWAC	9	-	-	-																		R◦						R•	R_{3}			R•					R•	R•	R•	R•								R•
Miami (OH)	MAC	9	-	-	-																								R•				R_{3}			R_{3}				R_{3}				R•	R_{3}	R_{2}	R_{3}	R_{3}	
Harvard	Ivy League	8	-	-	-																	R_{3}		R◦							R•				R•	R_{2}						R•	R•			R•			
Mississippi Valley State	SWAC	8	-	-	-																							R•	R•	R•	R•	R•	R_{3}			R•	R•												
Albany	America East	8	-	-	-																								R•	R•	R_{2}				R•			R_{3}			R•	R•					R•		
USC Upstate	Big South	8	-	-	-																																R_{3}	R_{3}	R_{3}	R_{3}	R_{3}						R•	R•	R_{2}
South Alabama	Sun Belt	7	-	-	-																															R_{2}	R_{2}	R_{2}	R_{2}					R_{3}			R_{2}		R•
Saint Francis (PA)	D3	7	-	-	-																																				R_{3}	R•	R•	R•	R•		R_{3}	R•	
Campbell	CAA	6	-	-	-														R•													R_{3}	R•											R_{3}	R•	R_{3}			
Coastal Carolina	Sun Belt	6	-	-	-																	R•		R_{3}	R◦					R•						R_{3}												R_{3}	
UMBC	America East	6	-	-	-																			R◦		R◦																	R•	R•	R•	R•			
Marist	Metro	6	-	-	-																									R•							R•			R•						R•		R_{3}	R•
Portland State	Big Sky	6	-	-	-																									R_{3}			R•		R•	R_{3}	R•							R•					
UNC Greensboro	Southern	5	-	-	-																R•																					R•		R•		R•			R_{3}
Northwestern State	Southland	5	-	-	-																	R•		R◦		R◦											R•	R•											
Cornell	Ivy League	5	-	-	-																		R◦		R◦			R◦					R•	R•															
Longwood	Big South	5	-	-	-																																R•		R_{3}	R_{2}	R_{2}		R•						
Weber State	Big Sky	5	-	-	-																																		R•	R•			R_{3}		R•			R_{3}	
Grand Canyon	Mountain West	5	-	-	-																																								R•	R_{3}	R_{2}	R_{3}	R_{2}
Western Illinois	Ohio Valley	4	-	-	-											R_{3}								R◦	R◦							R_{3}																	
Sacramento State	Big West	4	-	-	-												R_{3}		R•													R•										R•							
Drake	Missouri Valley	4	-	-	-													R•														R•										R_{2}	R_{3}						
East Carolina	American	4	-	-	-																		R◦									R_{3}		R_{2}	R_{2}														
Seton Hall	Big East	4	-	-	-																				R◦			R•	R_{3}																	R•			
Oakland	Horizon	4	-	-	-																					R◦	R◦												R•						R•				
Wright State	defunct	4	-	-	-																						R◦				R•	R•		R_{3}															
UC Santa Barbara	Big West	4	-	-	-																							R◦		R•	R•																	R_{2}	
Loyola Marymount	West Coast	4	-	-	-																								R•		R_{2}														R_{3}	R_{3}			
Tennessee Tech	Southern	4	-	-	-																								R•	R•	R_{2}								R_{3}										
Howard	MEAC	4	-	-	-																										R•														R•			R•	R•
Iona	Metro	4	-	-	-																													R•	R•	R•		R•											
Virginia	ACC	4	-	-	-																													R_{3}													R_{2}	R_{3}	R_{2}
New Mexico State	CUSA	4	-	-	-																														R_{3}				R_{3}		R•	R•							
Maine	America East	3	-	-	-													R•										R◦												R•									
Ohio	MAC	3	-	-	-														R•																			R•				R_{2}							
Boston College	ACC	3	-	-	-																R_{3}	R•					R•																						
Cleveland State	defunct	3	-	-	-																R•												R•														R•		
Ball State	MAC	3	-	-	-																	R•												R•					R_{3}										
Colgate	Patriot	3	-	-	-																		R◦				R◦				R•																		
Southeast Missouri State	Ohio Valley	3	-	-	-																		R•																				R_{3}				R•		
Army	Patriot	3	-	-	-																			R◦		R◦											R•												
Middle Tennessee	CUSA	3	-	-	-																			R◦																		R•				R_{2}			
Eastern Kentucky	UAC	3	-	-	-																					R•		R◦																R•					
FIU	CUSA	3	-		-	-																						R◦							R_{2}							R_{3}							
Texas A&M–Corpus Christi	Southland	3	-	-	-																						R◦	R◦	R_{3}																				
Georgia Southern	Sun Belt	3	-	-	-																									R_{3}						R•	R_{3}												
Nevada	Mountain West	3	-	-	-																									R•		R_{2}	R_{3}																
Southern Utah	Big Sky	3	-	-	-																									R•	R_{3}							R•											
Stetson	ASUN	3	-	-	-																										R•							R_{3}											R_{3}
Lipscomb	ASUN	3	-	-	-																													R_{2}				R_{2}					R_{3}						
Saint Mary's	West Coast	3	-	-	-																													R•													R•		R_{2}
Syracuse	ACC	3	-	-	-																													R•	R_{3}	R_{2}													
Jackson State	SWAC	3	-	-	-																														R•												R•	R•	
Valparaiso	Missouri Valley	3	-	-	-																															R•	R_{3}			R•									
Marshall	Sun Belt	3	-	-	-																																R_{3}				R_{3}								R_{3}
Western Kentucky	CUSA	3	-	-	-																																R_{2}		R_{2}					R_{3}					
Texas Southern	SWAC	3	-	-	-																																	R•	R•		R•								
Binghamton	America East	3	-	-	-																																		R•									R•	R•
Alabama State	SWAC	3	-	-	-																																			R•			R•	R•					
Prairie View A&M	SWAC	3	-	-	-																																					R•			R•	R•			
Villanova	Big East	3	-	-	-																																							R_{3}	R•		R_{2}		
Eastern Illinois	Ohio Valley	3	-	-	-																																									R•		R•	R•
Omaha	Summit	3	-	-	-																																									R_{3}	R_{2}	R_{3}	
Southeastern Louisiana	Southland	3	-	-	-																																										R_{2}	R_{2}	R•
Iowa State	Big 12	2	-	-	-							R_{3}																																R_{2}					
Georgia State	Sun Belt	2	-	-	-													R•																	R•														
Troy	Sun Belt	2	-	-	-															R•																								R_{3}					
Brown	Ivy League	2	-	-	-																R•																											R•	
Rider	Metro	2	-	-	-																R•						R◦																						
Manhattan	Metro	2	-	-	-																		R◦																					R•					
Southern	SWAC	2	-	-	-																		R◦				R◦																						
Centenary	D3	2	-	-	-																							R◦	R•																				
UTSA	American	2	-	-	-																							R◦		R•																			
Charleston	CAA	2	-	-	-																								R_{2}																				R•
Green Bay	Horizon	2	-	-	-																								R_{3}									R•											
Robert Morris	Horizon	2	-	-	-																								R•																			R•	
Cal Poly	Big West	2	-	-	-																										R•		R_{2}																
Sam Houston	CUSA	2	-	-	-																										R_{3}												R_{3}						
Winthrop	Big South	2	-	-	-																										R_{2}	R•																	
Purdue	Big Ten	2	-	-	-																											R_{3}	R_{2}																
Stony Brook	CAA	2	-	-	-																											R•					R•												
Bradley	Missouri Valley	2	-	-	-																												R_{3}					R•											
Radford	Big South	2	-	-	-																												R_{3}	R_{2}															
Sacred Heart	Metro	2	-	-	-																												R_{3}		R•														
UT Martin	Ohio Valley	2	-	-	-																												R•			R•													
Elon	CAA	2	-	-	-																													R•														R•	
Florida Gulf Coast	ASUN	2	-	-	-																															R_{3}											R_{3}		
Central Connecticut	NEC	2	-	-	-																																R_{3}		R•										
Dartmouth	Ivy League	2	-	-	-																																	R•	R•										
Central Arkansas	UAC	2	-	-	-																																		R•							R_{3}			
Fairfield	Metro	2	-	-	-																																		R•		R•								
Boise State	Pac-12	2	-	-	-																																					R•	R_{2}						
Kennesaw State	CUSA	2	-	-	-																																					R•		R_{3}					
Monmouth	CAA	2	-	-	-																																					R•	R•						
Seattle	West Coast	2	-	-	-																																						R_{3}	R_{3}					
Morgan State	MEAC	2	-	-	-																																							R•			R•		
South Dakota State	Summit	2	-	-	-																																							R_{3}	R_{3}				
UNC Wilmington	CAA	2	-	-	-																																								R•		R•		
Charlotte	American	2	-	-	-																																									R_{2}	R_{3}		
Northern Colorado	Big Sky	2	-	-	-																																									R•	R•		
Northern Kentucky	Horizon	2	-	-	-																																									R•			R•
Belmont	Missouri Valley	2	-	-	-																																											R_{3}	R_{3}
Providence	Big East	1	-	-	-													R_{3}																															
Louisiana–Monroe	Sun Belt	1	-	-	-																R_{3}																												
Niagara	Metro	1	-	-	-																	R•																											
Saint Peter's	Metro	1	-	-	-																				R◦																								
Evansville	Missouri Valley	1	-	-	-																					R◦																							
UT Arlington	UAC	1	-	-	-																						R_{3}																						
Youngstown State	Horizon	1	-	-	-																									R•																			
Eastern Michigan	defunct	1	-	-	-																										R•																		
Furman	Southern	1	-	-	-																										R•																		
Delaware State	MEAC	1	-	-	-																											R•																	
Stephen F. Austin	Southland	1	-	-	-																											R•																	
Alcorn State	SWAC	1	-	-	-																													R•															
Bucknell	Patriot	1	-	-	-																													R•															
UC Davis	Mountain West	1	-	-	-																													R•															
Jacksonville	ASUN	1	-	-	-																														R_{3}														
Memphis	American	1	-	-	-																														R_{3}														
Hampton	CAA	1	-	-	-																																R•												
Penn	Ivy League	1	-	-	-																																R•												
Purdue Fort Wayne	defunct	1	-	-	-																																R•												
Bryant	America East	1	-	-	-																																	R•											
Charleston Southern	Big South	1	-	-	-																																	R•											
SIU Edwardsville	Ohio Valley	1	-	-	-																																	R•											
Utah Valley	Big West	1	-	-	-																																	R•											
Indiana State	Missouri Valley	1	-	-	-																																		R_{3}										
Pittsburgh	ACC	1	-	-	-																																		R_{2}										
St. John's	Big East	1	-	-	-																																		R•										
Butler	Big East	1	-	-	-																																			R•									
Cal State Bakersfield	Big West	1	-	-	-																																			R•									
Samford	Southern	1	-	-	-																																			R•									
East Tennessee State	Southern	1	-	-	-																																				R•								
Montana	Big Sky	1	-	-	-																																				R•								
Detroit Mercy	Horizon	1	-	-	-																																						R•						
George Washington	Atlantic 10	1	-	-	-																																							R•					
Murray State	Missouri Valley	1	-	-	-																																								R•				
North Texas	American	1	-	-	-																																								R_{2}				
George Mason	Atlantic 10	1	-	-	-																																									R•			
North Carolina Central	MEAC	1	-	-	-																																									R•			
Dayton	Atlantic 10	1	-	-	-																																										R•		
Siena	Metro	1	-	-	-																																										R•		
Mercer	Southern	1	-	-	-																																											R_{2}	
North Florida	ASUN	1	-	-	-																																											R_{2}	
Saint Louis	Atlantic 10	1	-	-	-																																											R•	
Santa Clara	West Coast	1	-	-	-																																											R•	
Akron	MAC	1	-	-	-																																												R_{3}
California Baptist	Big West	1	-	-	-																																												R•
Idaho State	Big Sky	1	-	-	-																																												R•
South Dakota	Summit	1	-	-	-																																												R_{3}
Wagner	NEC	1	-	-	-																																												R•

=== List of NCAA Division I teams with no appearances ===
List of schools
School	Conference
UMass Lowell	America East
Austin Peay	UAC
Bellarmine	ASUN
North Alabama	UAC
Queens	ASUN
West Georgia (Note: Will become eligible for the tournament in 2028 after completing transition period from Division II.)	UAC
Loyola Chicago	Atlantic 10
St. Bonaventure	Atlantic 10
Saint Joseph's	Atlantic 10
Georgetown	Big East
Gardner–Webb	Big South
Presbyterian	Big South
UC Riverside	Big West
UC San Diego	Big West (Note: Joining the West Coast Conference in July 2027.)
Drexel	CAA
North Carolina A&T	CAA
Towson	CAA
Delaware	CUSA
UTEP	Mountain West
IU Indy	Horizon
Columbia	Ivy League
Yale	Ivy League
Merrimack	Metro
Mount St. Mary's	Metro
Quinnipiac	Metro
Buffalo	MAC
Coppin State	MEAC
Maryland Eastern Shore	MEAC
Norfolk State	MEAC
South Carolina State	MEAC
Fairleigh Dickinson	NEC
Le Moyne (Note: Will become eligible for the tournament in 2027 after completing transition period from Division II.)	NEC
Mercyhurst	NEC
New Haven (Note: Will become eligible for the tournament in 2029 after completing transition period from Division II.)	NEC
Stonehill	NEC
Lindenwood	Ohio Valley
Morehead State	Ohio Valley
Southern Indiana	Ohio Valley
Tennessee State	Ohio Valley
Holy Cross	Patriot
Lafayette	Patriot
Western Carolina	Southern
Wofford	Southern
East Texas A&M	Southland
Houston Christian	Southland
Incarnate Word	Southland
Lamar	Southland
Alabama A&M	SWAC
Arkansas–Pine Bluff	SWAC
Grambling State	SWAC
Kansas City	Summit
North Dakota	Summit
St. Thomas	Summit
Appalachian State	Sun Belt
San Diego	West Coast
Abilene Christian	UAC
Tarleton State	UAC
Utah Tech	Big Sky

== Past formats ==
Year	Total Teams	Region			Super Regional	College World Series		
Year	Total Teams	No.	Teams	Format	Super Regional	Teams	Format	Championship
1982–1987	16 (Note: The 1986 tournament featured only 15 teams; the Midwest Regional was not held and Creighton automatically advanced to the Women's College World Series.)	8	2	Best-of-three		8	Double-elimination	
1988–1993	20	8	2 (4 regions)	Best-of-three		8	Double-elimination	
1988–1993	20	8	3 (4 regions)	Double-elimination		8	Double-elimination	
1994–1998	32	8	4	Double-elimination		8	Double-elimination	Single game
1999–2002	48	8	6	Double-elimination		8	Double-elimination	Single game
2003–2004	64	8	8	Double-elimination		8	Double-elimination	Single game
2005–present	64	16	4	Double-elimination	Best-of-three	8	Double-elimination	Best-of-three

== See also ==
- AIAW Intercollegiate Women's Softball Champions
- NCAA Division II softball tournament
- NCAA Division III softball tournament
- NAIA Softball Championship
