= St. Bonaventure Bonnies softball =

- University: St. Bonaventure University
- Head coach: Camden Decker (2nd season)
- Conference: Atlantic 10
- Location: St. Bonaventure, New York, US
- Home stadium: Joyce Field
- Nickname: Bonnies
- Colors: Brown and white

The St. Bonaventure Bonnies softball team represents St. Bonaventure University for college softball in NCAA Division I. The team participates in the Atlantic 10 Conference (A-10). The Bonnies are currently led by head coach Mike Threehouse. The team plays its home games at Joyce Field located on the university's campus.

== History ==
Since joining the Atlantic 10 Conference in 1988, the Bonnies have failed to win a regular season championship or a conference tournament championship. By failing to win the latter, they have also failed to qualify for the NCAA Division I softball tournament. The team's best conference finish came in the 2008 season, where the Bonnies finished in second place after going 11–7 in conference play.

The Bonnies have won several awards since joining the A-10. Coach Mike Threehouse was named A-10 Coach of the Year in 2006. Third baseman and pitcher Brianna Bricker was named A-10 Softball Student-Athlete of the Year in 2008.

=== Coaching history ===
| Years | Coach | Record | % |
|---|---|---|---|
| 1988–1990 | Molly Quattrone | 20–66 | .233 |
| 1991–1993 | Cindy Ryan-Nannen | 17–43 | .283 |
| 1993–1996 | Todd Randall | 27–102–1 | .212 |
| 1997–present | Mike Threehouse | 343–741–1 | .317 |

== Roster ==
2023 St. Bonaventure Bonnies roster
| Pitchers: 12 – Elizabeth Lis – Senior; 88 – Emily Phelan – Junior; 26 – Kayla Ziemke – Freshman; Catchers: 33 – Shannon Costello – Senior; 25 – Abby Farber – Freshman; 99 – Reagan Mangos – Freshman; 32 – Madison Stewart – Graduate Student; 7 – Abby Suhr – Senior; Outfielders: 1 – Brooke Bobbey – Junior; 27 – Lyndsay Flippin – Senior; 17 – Bryana Martinez – Freshman; 21 – Courtnee Peterson – Sophomore; 9 – Olivia Santos – Freshman; 10 – Juanita Wolak – Senior | Infielders: 13 – Autumn Black – Senior; 23 – Elyse Graham – Junior; 24 – Kennedy Haberl – Junior; 22 – Victoria Jacques – Sophomore; 19 – Zoey Kota – Sophomore; 15 – Emily McKenna – Sophomore; 8 – Macy Miller – Senior; 14 – Emily Piergustavo – Graduate Student; 79 – Sidney Rose – Freshman; 6 – Grace Walker – Junior; Designated Player: 30 – Olivia Moon – Senior; Utility: 2 – Reanna Perkins – Freshman; 11 – Tess Spangenburg – Freshman; 0 – Olivia Whitecar – Junior |

== Season-by-season results ==
Record table
| Season | Coach | Overall | Conference | Standing | Postseason |
|---|---|---|---|---|---|
St. Bonaventure Bonnies (Atlantic 10 Conference) (1988–present)
| 1988 | Molly Quattrone | 8–23 | 0–12 | 7th | |
| 1989 | Molly Quattrone | 9–20 | 1–11 | T–6th | |
| 1990 | Molly Quattrone | 3–23 | 0–12 | 7th | |
| 1991 | Cindy Ryan-Nannen | 7–21 | 0–10 | 7th | |
| 1992 | Cindy Ryan-Nannen | 10–22 | 0–10 | 6th | |
| 1993 | Cindy Ryan-Nannen/Todd Randall | 3–21 | 0–10 | 6th | |
| 1994 | Todd Randall | 3–27 | 1–9 | 6th | |
| 1995 | Todd Randall | 11–25–1 | 0–10 | 6th | |
| 1996 | Todd Randall | 10–29 | 6–9 | 6th | |
| 1997 | Mike Threehouse | 13–23 | 3–13 | 8th | |
| 1998 | Mike Threehouse | 17–21 | 4–8 | 7th | |
| 1999 | Mike Threehouse | 11–36 | 4–12 | 8th | |
| 2000 | Mike Threehouse | 19–28 | 6–8 | 6th | |
| 2001 | Mike Threehouse | 9–34 | 5–16 | T–7th | |
| 2002 | Mike Threehouse | 12–22 | 7–14 | 6th | |
| 2003 | Mike Threehouse | 19–21 | 5–11 | 8th | |
| 2004 | Mike Threehouse | 12–24 | 6–8 | 4th | |
| 2005 | Mike Threehouse | 14–26 | 8–6 | T–3rd | |
| 2006 | Mike Threehouse | 23–22 | 14–6 | 4th | |
| 2007 | Mike Threehouse | 18–18 | 6–9 | 8th | |
| 2008 | Mike Threehouse | 20–25 | 11–7 | 2nd | |
| 2009 | Mike Threehouse | 12–28 | 9–11 | 6th | |
| 2010 | Mike Threehouse | 13–27 | 7–11 | 8th | |
| 2011 | Mike Threehouse | 13–20 | 8–12 | 8th | |
| 2012 | Mike Threehouse | 17–27 | 6–14 | 9th | |
| 2013 | Mike Threehouse | 10–42 | 4–18 | 10th | |
| 2014 | Mike Threehouse | 7–33 | 4–11 | 9th | |
| 2015 | Mike Threehouse | 15–24 | 7–11 | 7th | |
| 2016 | Mike Threehouse | 15–32 | 8–14 | 8th | |
| 2017 | Mike Threehouse | 12–37 | 2–17 | 10th | |
| 2018 | Mike Threehouse | 10–32 | 3–18 | 9th | |
| 2019 | Mike Threehouse | 9–36 | 5–17 | T–9th | |
| 2020 | Mike Threehouse | 2–3 | 0–0 | N/A | Season cut short due to COVID-19 pandemic |
| 2021 | Mike Threehouse | 2–26 | 2–22 | 9th | |
| 2022 | Mike Threehouse | 8–38 | 1–23 | 10th | |
| 2023 | Mike Threehouse | 11–36–1 | 6–20 | 10th | |
| Total: | | 422–926–2 (.313) | | | |
National champion Postseason invitational champion Conference regular season champion Conference regular season and conference tournament champion Division regular season champion Division regular season and conference tournament champion Conference tournament champion

== See also ==
- List of NCAA Division I softball programs
