= Billiken Sports Center =

College baseball stadium in Missouri, U.S.

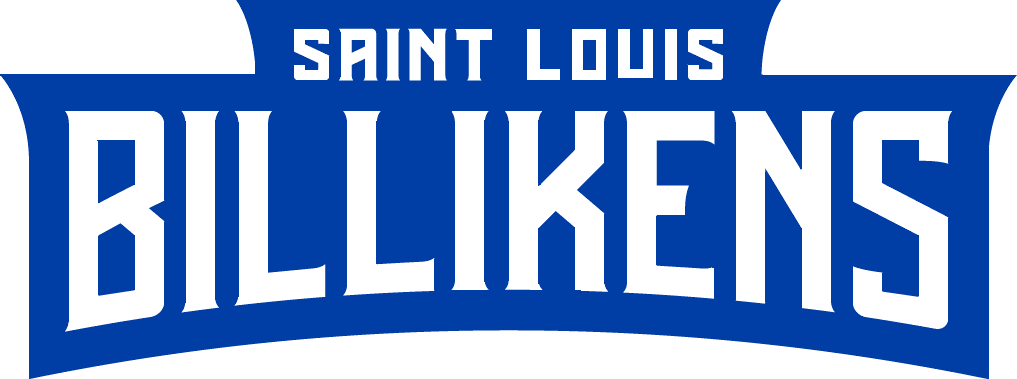

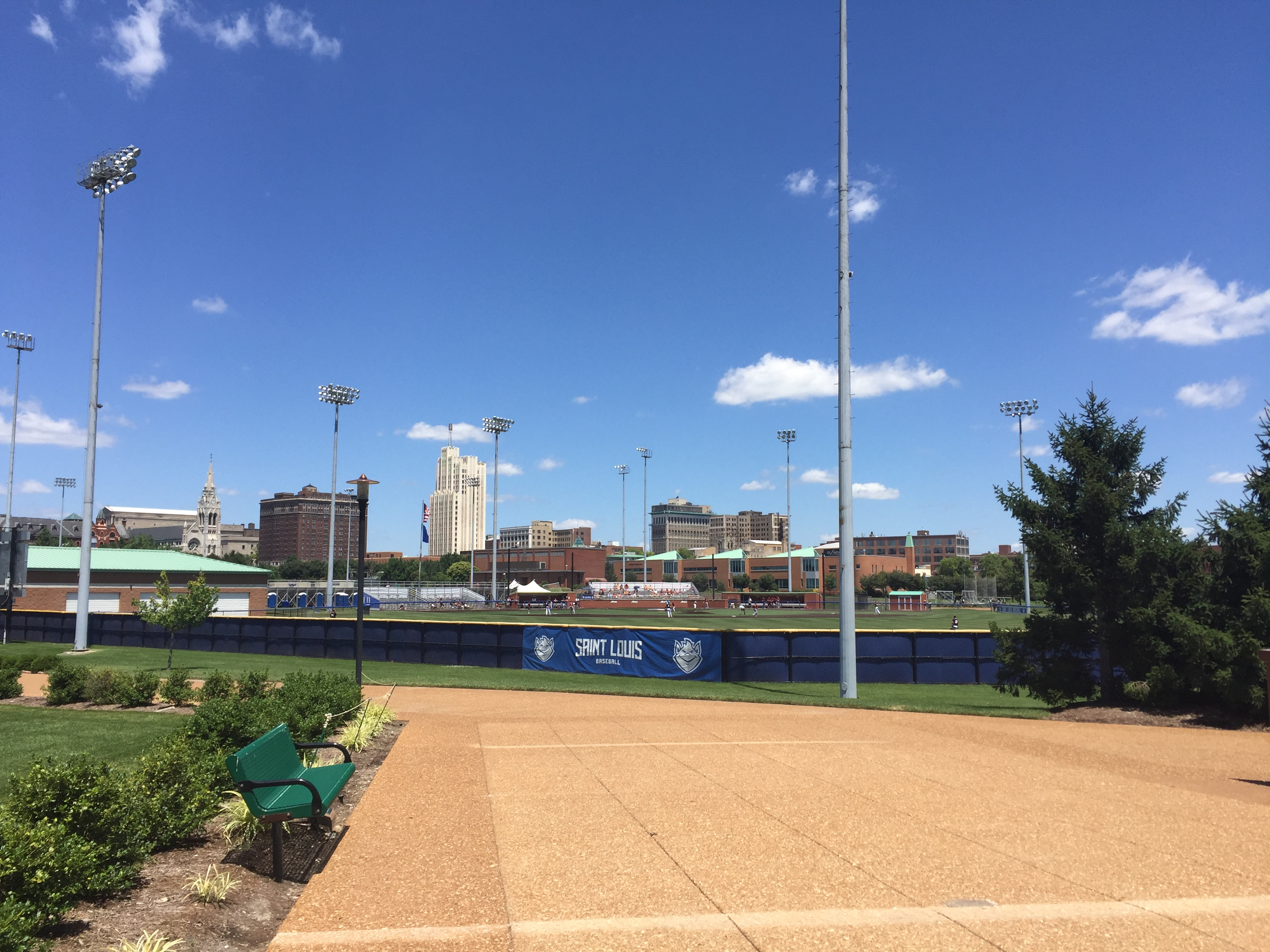
- Exterior view of the stadium in 2017
- Interactive map of Billiken Sports Center
- Address: St. Louis, MO; Laclede Avenue east of Grand Boulevard; United States
- Coordinates: 38.634481°N 90.229232°W
- Owner: Saint Louis University
- Operator: Saint Louis University
- Capacity: 500
- Type: Ballpark
- Surface: Natural grass (1999–present); Artificial turf (1990–1999)
- Scoreboard: Electronic
- Field size: Left Field: 330 feet (100 m); Left Center Field: 370 feet (110 m); Center Field: 403 feet (123 m); Right Center Field: 370 feet (110 m); Right Field: 330 feet (100 m)
- Current use: Baseball

Construction
- Built: 1990
- Opened: 1990; 36 years ago
- Renovated: 1994, 1995, 1999
- Cost: US$1.5 million (estimated)
- Architects: Hastings and Chivetta
- Main contractor: Sverdrup Corporation

Tenants
- Saint Louis Billikens (NCAA) teams: Baseball (1992–present); softball (2000–present); men's soccer (1990–1994)

Website
- slubillikens.com/billiken-sports-center

The Billiken Sports Center is a baseball venue in St. Louis, Missouri, United States. It is home to the Saint Louis Billikens baseball team of the NCAA Division I Atlantic 10 Conference. The facility also includes the softball venue used since 2000 by the Billiken softball program. From 1990–1994, the facility was also home to Saint Louis' soccer programs. The baseball facility, built in 1991 and first used in 1992, has a capacity of 500 spectators.

== History ==
Prior to the opening of the Billiken Sports Center, Saint Louis' baseball program played at Sauget Field in Sauget, Illinois. The first baseball game at the current venue was played on March 2, 1992. The Billikens defeated the Division III Washington University Bears 7–3.

The facility underwent several renovations in the 1990s. In 1994, fences in foul territory were improved, and in 1995, the outfield fence was renovated. In 1999, the field's artificial turf surface was replaced with natural grass.

As of the end of the 2009 season, Saint Louis baseball had a 248–205 record at the facility.

== Features ==
In addition to the features added in 1990s renovations, the field also has a brick backstop, brick dugouts, padded outfield fences, bullpens, and batting cages.

Chaifetz Arena is visible beyond the center field wall of the baseball diamond.

== See also ==
- List of NCAA Division I baseball venues
