= George Mason Patriots softball =

College softball team

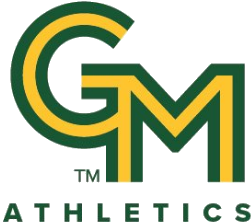
- University: George Mason University
- Head coach: Justin Walker (5th season)
- Conference: Atlantic 10
- Location: Fairfax, Virginia, US
- Home stadium: George Mason Softball Complex (capacity: 1,550)
- Nickname: Patriots
- Colors: Green and gold

NCAA Tournament appearances
- 2023

Conference tournament championships
- 2023

The George Mason Patriots softball team represents George Mason University in the NCAA Division I college softball. The team participates in the Atlantic 10 Conference (A-10). From 2002 until 2013, the team was a member of the Colonial Athletic Association (CAA). The Patriots are currently led by head coach Justin Walker. The team plays its home games at George Mason Softball Complex located on the university's campus.

== History ==
George Mason qualified for the NCAA Division I softball tournament for the first time in 2023 after winning the Atlantic 10 Conference tournament, defeating Loyola Chicago by a score of 6-3. The Patriots faced off against Duke in their first game of the tournament, losing 2-1 in a close contest. They were eliminated from the tournament by Campbell, losing by a score of 7-1.

Former shortstop Stacy James was named Colonial Athletic Association Rookie of the Year in 2002, and in 2003 was named CAA Player of the Year. In 2010, James was named to the CAA's 25th Anniversary softball team. In 2017, former pitcher Marina Vitalich was named as the Atlantic 10 Co-Pitcher of the Year, sharing the honors with Fordham pitcher Lauren Quense.

=== George Mason in the NCAA Tournament ===
Year	Record	Pct	Notes
2023	0–2	.000	Durham Regional
TOTALS	0-2	.000	

=== Coaching history ===
Years	Coach	Record	%
1978–1980	Judy Ferrier	41–20	.672
1981	Penny Butler	35–10	.778
1982–1986	Doug Wheelbarger	160–55–1	.743
1987–1996	Mitch Hughes	171–244	.412
1997–2003	Beth Fulcher	183–195	.484
2004–2019	Joe Verbanic	315–498	.387
2020–present	Justin Walker	81–78	.509

== Roster ==
2024 George Mason Patriots roster
Pitchers: 29 – Jordan Anderson – Junior; 32 – Carly Cooper – Senior; 10 – Haleigh Dellow – Freshman; 9 – Harlowe Nigh – Sophomore; 39 – Jordan Tallman – Junior; 36 – Kylie Wilkerson – Freshman; Catchers: 35 – Cheyenne DeGross – Sophomore; 15 – Logan Pickford – Sophomore; 19 – Zoe Vozick – Senior	Outfielders: 33 – Sydney Bales – Senior; 28 – Sydney Blackwell – Junior; 20 – Elyssa DeRosa – Sophomore; 11 – Emily Lampela – Freshman; 6 – Charlotte Montgomery – Junior; 14 – Hayley Shifflett – Junior; Infielders: 21 – Marlaina Bozek – Senior; 25 – Kaleigh Friend – Freshman; 12 – Kamryn Inman – Sophomore; 23 – Maya McGowan – Sophomore; 24 – Maddy Myers – Graduate Student; 8 – Dara Jo Sharpe – Freshman; 27 – Rachel Warrens – Graduate Student

== Season-by-season results ==
Record table
Season	Coach	Overall	Conference	Standing	Postseason
George Mason Patriots (AIAW) (1978–1982)
1978	Judy Ferrier	7–3			
1979	Judy Ferrier	11–9			
1980	Judy Ferrier	23–8			
1981	Penny Butler	35–10			
1982	Doug Wheelbarger	26–12			
George Mason Patriots (Independent) (1983–2001)
1983	Doug Wheelbarger	41–2			
1984	Doug Wheelbarger	33–17			
1985	Doug Wheelbarger	53–8			
1986	Doug Wheelbarger	33–16–1			
1987	Mitch Hughes	11–17			
1988	Mitch Hughes	22–26			
1989	Mitch Hughes	13–18			
1990	Mitch Hughes	12–26			
1991	Mitch Hughes	21–23			
1992	Mitch Hughes	13–26			
1993	Mitch Hughes	15–24			
1994	Mitch Hughes	21–31			
1995	Mitch Hughes	32–25			
1996	Mitch Hughes	11–28			
1997	Beth Fulcher	21–20			
1998	Beth Fulcher	16–39			
1999	Beth Fulcher	20–39			
2000	Beth Fulcher	34–29			
2001	Beth Fulcher	22–27			
George Mason Patriots (Colonial Athletic Association) (2002–2013)
2002	Beth Fulcher	40–19	9–4	2nd	
2003	Beth Fulcher	30–22	9–6	2nd	
2004	Joe Verbanic	28–32	8–10	5th	
2005	Joe Verbanic	22–31	6–11	T–5th	
2006	Joe Verbanic	8–48	5–15	8th	
2007	Joe Verbanic	19–34	5–16	8th	
2008	Joe Verbanic	19–32	6–14	6th	
2009	Joe Verbanic	16–33	2–16	8th	
2010	Joe Verbanic	21–24	9–12	5th	
2011	Joe Verbanic	19–25	8–12	T–5th	
2012	Joe Verbanic	13–41	7–14	7th	
2013	Joe Verbanic	18–37	6–15	6th	
George Mason Patriots (Atlantic 10 Conference) (2014–present)
2014	Joe Verbanic	22–21	6–10	7th	
2015	Joe Verbanic	23–29	11–12	4th	
2016	Joe Verbanic	22–25	8–13	7th	
2017	Joe Verbanic	23–33	12–11	6th	
2018	Joe Verbanic	22–28	12–10	4th	
2019	Joe Verbanic	22–25	10–12	7th	
2020	Justin Walker	7–12	0–0	N/A	Season cut short due to COVID-19 pandemic
2021	Justin Walker	19–18	9–16	7th	
2022	Justin Walker	24–26	12–12	T–6th	
2023	Justin Walker	35–24	16–10	4th	NCAA Regionals
2024	Justin Walker	0–0	0–0		
Total:		1,017–1,100–1 (.480)			
National champion Postseason invitational champion Conference regular season champion Conference regular season and conference tournament champion Division regular season champion Division regular season and conference tournament champion Conference tournament champion

== See also ==
- List of NCAA Division I softball programs
