= Dayton Flyers softball =

College softball team

Dayton Flyers
- University: University of Dayton
- Head coach: Cara Clark (17th season)
- Conference: Atlantic 10
- Location: Dayton, OH
- Home stadium: University of Dayton Softball Stadium
- Nickname: Flyers
- Colors: Red and blue

NCAA Tournament appearances
- 2024

Conference tournament championships
- 2024

Regular-season conference championships
- 2015, 2024, 2025

The Dayton Flyers softball team represents the University of Dayton in the NCAA Division I college softball. The team participates in the Atlantic 10 Conference (A-10). From 1990 until 1993, the team was a member of the Midwestern Collegiate Conference (MCC), now known as the Horizon League. From 1994 until 1995, the team was a member of the Great Midwest Conference (GMC). The Flyers are currently led by head coach Cara Clark. The team plays its home games at UD Softball Stadium located on the university's campus.

== History ==
Since joining the Atlantic 10 Conference in 1996, Dayton has had minimal success as a program, having failed to win a conference tournament title or make an appearance in the NCAA Division I softball tournament. Since the hiring of current coach Cara Clark, however, the program has found some success. In 2015, the Flyers achieved their best record in program history after finishing the season with a 39–15 record, winning the Atlantic 10 regular season title despite being picked to finish fifth in the conference in preseason standings. In 2023, the program achieved its best season since 2015, finishing the year with a 35–20 record and placing third in conference standings.

The Flyers have won several Atlantic 10 Conference awards. The program has won A-10 Player of the year three times, winning in 2000 with Sara Hatcher, 2015 with Tiffany Ricks, and 2017 with Gabrielle Snyder. The program has won two A-10 Pitcher of the Year awards, winning in 2015 with Kayla English and in 2016 with Manda Cash, and two A-10 Rookie of the Year awards, winning in 2015 with Manda Cash and in 2022 with Emma Schutter. In 2015, Clark was named A-10 Coach of the Year.

=== Dayton in the NCAA Tournament ===
Year	Record	Pct	Notes
2024	0–2	.000	Knoxville Regional
TOTALS	0-2	.000	

=== Coaching history ===
Years	Coach	Record	%
1980	Shirley Oswald	7–9	.438
1981–1983	Doug Hauschild	25–30–1	.455
1984–1987	Jeryl Neff	56–68	.452
1988	Terry Parks	9–27	.300
1989–1992	Becky Dicke	48–101	.322
1993–1995	Daryl Ogg	21–94	.183
1996–2007	Jodi Eickemeyer	231–323–5	.418
2008–present	Cara Clark	380–405–2	.484

== Roster ==
2024 Dayton Flyers roster
Pitchers: 25 – Sarah Bailitz – Graduate Student; 18 – Haven Dwyer – Junior; 53 – Izzy Kemp – Sophomore; 8 – Sami Scholtz – Freshman; Catchers: 9 – Madelyn Fricano – Sophomore; 7 – Nicolette Papavasiliou – Graduate Student; 5 – Katie Reeg – Graduate Student	Outfielders: 11 – Emily Daniel – Graduate Student; 4 – Kara Gunter – Senior; 1 – Dee Hyde – Freshman; 16 – Norah O'Donnell – Freshman; 3 – Emma Schutter – Junior; Infielders: 2 – Kirnan Bailey – Freshman; 17 – Dierdre Flaherty – Freshman; 22 – Molly Grace – Sophomore; 19 – Maddie Kapsimalis – Junior; 24 – Elizabeth Shafer – Senior; 23 – Kaelene Walter – Graduate Student; 6 – Chloe Wong – Junior

== Season-by-season results ==
Statistics overview
Season	Coach	Overall	Conference	Standing	Postseason
Dayton Flyers (Independent) (1980–1989)
1980	Shirley Oswald	7–9			
1981	Doug Hauschild	6–11–1			
1982	Doug Hauschild	17–8			
1983	Doug Hauschild	2–11			
1984	Jeryl Neff	13–11			
1985	Jeryl Neff	12–15			
1986	Jeryl Neff	20–14			
1987	Jeryl Neff	11–28			
1988	Terry Parks	9–27			
1989	Becky Dicke	14–21			
Dayton Flyers (Midwestern Collegiate Conference) (1990–1993)
1990	Becky Dicke	15–14	5–3	3rd	
1991	Becky Dicke	7–32	2–8	7th	
1992	Becky Dicke	12–34	0–10	6th	
1993	Daryl Ogg	9–28	2–10	6th	
Dayton Flyers (Great Midwest Conference) (1994–1995)
1994	Daryl Ogg	6–39			
1995	Daryl Ogg	6–27			
Dayton Flyers (Atlantic 10 Conference) (1996–present)
1996	Jodi Eickemeyer	15–23–1	4–9	8th	
1997	Jodi Eickemeyer	16–27–2	6–8–1	7th	
1998	Jodi Eickemeyer	23–23	8–6	3rd	
1999	Jodi Eickemeyer	20–36	8–6	4th	
2000	Jodi Eickemeyer	35–23–1	10–4	3rd	
2001	Jodi Eickemeyer	19–31	9–12	5th	
2002	Jodi Eickemeyer	17–26	11–10	5th	
2003	Jodi Eickemeyer	23–21	9–7	5th	
2004	Jodi Eickemeyer	14–35	4–10	6th	
2005	Jodi Eickemeyer	20–18–1	8–8	5th	
2006	Jodi Eickemeyer	18–30	8–12	6th	
2007	Jodi Eickemeyer	11–30	3–14	10th	
2008	Cara Clark	20–31	7–13	9th	
2009	Cara Clark	13–34	7–13	8th	
2010	Cara Clark	18–36–1	6–14	9th	
2011	Cara Clark	22–26	11–8	6th	
2012	Cara Clark	22–29	9–10	7th	
2013	Cara Clark	22–24	12–9	6th	
2014	Cara Clark	27–29	9–9	5th	
2015	Cara Clark	39–14	20–2	1st	
2016	Cara Clark	27–21–1	14–5–1	2nd	
2017	Cara Clark	29–27	13–10	4th	
2018	Cara Clark	31–25	15–8	3rd	
2019	Cara Clark	24–27	11–7	4th	
2020	Cara Clark	8–12	0–0	N/A	Season cut short due to COVID-19 pandemic
2021	Cara Clark	21–26	14–8	2nd	
2022	Cara Clark	22–24	12–10	5th	
2023	Cara Clark	35–20	15–7	3rd	
2024	Cara Clark	0–0	0–0		
Total:		777–1,037–8 (.429)			
National champion Postseason invitational champion Conference regular season champion Conference regular season and conference tournament champion Division regular season champion Division regular season and conference tournament champion Conference tournament champion

== See also ==
- List of NCAA Division I softball programs
