= Fordham Rams softball =

College softball team

- University: Fordham University
- Head coach: Melissa Inouye (6th season)
- Conference: Atlantic 10
- Location: The Bronx, New York, US
- Home stadium: Bahoshy Softball Complex
- Nickname: Rams
- Colors: Maroon and white

NCAA Tournament appearances
- 2010, 2011, 2013, 2014, 2015, 2016, 2017, 2018, 2019, 2022, 2026

Conference tournament championships
- 2011, 2013, 2014, 2015, 2016, 2017, 2018, 2019, 2022, 2026

Regular-season conference championships
- 2005, 2009, 2014, 2016, 2017, 2019

For information on all Fordham University sports, see Fordham Rams

The Fordham Rams softball team represents Fordham University for college softball in NCAA Division I. The team participates in the Atlantic 10 Conference (A-10). From 1985 until 1990, the team was a member of the Metro Atlantic Athletic Conference (MAAC). From 1991 until 1995, the team was a member of the Patriot League (PL). The Rams are currently led by head coach Melissa Inouye. The team plays its home games at Bahoshy Softball Complex, which is located on the college's campus.

== History ==
After failing to finish a single season with a winning record prior to 2002, the program has become a dynasty in the Atlantic 10, winning six regular season championships, eight conference tournament championships, nine NCAA Division I softball tournament appearances, and finishing no worse than fourth in the conference each year since 2003. The program rose to prominence under former head coach Bridget Orchard, who was hired in 2002 and accumulated only one losing season in her time with Fordham.

In 2010, the Rams qualified for their first NCAA Division I softball tournament, getting in as an at-large bid after losing to UMass in the A-10 Conference championship game. The team was placed in the Seattle Super Regional where they defeated Maryland by a score of 2-1. After defeating Maryland, the program faced off against Oklahoma, losing by a score of 1-0. This put Fordham in the losers bracket and set up a rematch with Maryland, with Fordham winning again 5-2. In another rematch, the Rams were eliminated from the tournament by Oklahoma by a score of 2-0, ending the Rams unprecedented run in the Regional Finals.

In the 2015 NCAA Division I softball tournament, the Rams had another solid showing despite losing in their opening game to NC State by a score of 12-5. The team was sent to the losers bracket, where they faced off against Binghamton, defeating the team by a score of 8-0 in five innings via mercy rule. Fordham moved on to face #15 seeded James Madison, who they defeated in an upset by a score of 2-1. The Rams were eliminated from the tournament by NC State, losing 2-1 in the Regional Finals.

=== Fordham in the NCAA Tournament ===
Year	Record	Pct	Notes
2010	2–2	.500	College Park Regional
2011	1–2	.333	University Park Regional
2013	1–2	.333	Norman Regional
2014	0–2	.000	Tallahassee Regional
2015	2–2	.500	Harrisonburg Regional
2016	0–2	.000	Eugene Regional
2017	1–2	.333	Salt Lake City Regional
2018	0–2	.000	Baton Rouge Regional
2019	0–2	.000	Seattle Regional
2022	0–2	.000	Stillwater Regional
TOTALS	7-20	.259	

=== Coaching history ===
Years	Coach	Record	%
1985–1988	Anne Newhouse	22–54	.289
1989–1991	Don Mills	30–85	.261
1992–1996	Steve Kelly	61–107–2	.365
1997–2001	Debbie Corbett	65–173–1	.274
2002–2018	Bridget Orchard	624–377–1	.623
2019–present	Melissa Inouye	124–99	.556

== Roster ==
2024 Fordham Rams roster
Pitchers: 16 – Holly Beeman – Sophomore; 9 – Bailey Enoch – Senior; 19 – Devon Miller – Graduate Student; 55 – Olivia Simcoe – Freshman; 22 – Emilee Watkins – Junior; Catchers: 51 – Nicki Sudall – Sophomore; 46 – Sydney Wells – Junior; Outfielders: 5 – Michaela Carter – Graduate Student; 2 – Mallory McClellan – Junior; 20 – Neleh Nogay – Sophomore; 17 – Annie Sullivan – Freshman; 24 – Mikayla Swan – Freshman	Infielders: 21 – Bella Ayala – Senior; 3 – Allie Clark – Junior; 7 – Erin Hoppe – Freshman; 00 – Eva Koratsis – Sophomore; 25 – Kate McGuire – Sophomore; 12 – Julia Petrovich – Senior; 8 – Gianna Sarlo – Graduate Student

== Season-by-season results ==
Record table
Season	Coach	Overall	Conference	Standing	Postseason
Fordham Rams (Metro Atlantic Athletic Conference) (1985–1990)
1985	Anne Newhouse	3–15			
1986	Anne Newhouse	8–11			
1987	Anne Newhouse	6–15		5th	
1988	Anne Newhouse	5–16		7th	
1989	Don Mills	11–25		5th	
1990	Don Mills	10–33		5th	
Fordham Rams (Patriot League) (1991–1995)
1991	Don Mills	9–27	3–8	6th	
1992	Steve Kelly	12–23	5–7	5th	
1993	Steve Kelly	12–23	4–8	5th	
1994	Steve Kelly	14–14–2	7–5	4th	
1995	Steve Kelly	18–20	3–8	T–6th	
Fordham Rams (Atlantic 10 Conference) (1996–present)
1996	Steve Kelly	5–27	1–15	9th	
1997	Debbie Corbett	7–33	1–15	9th	
1998	Debbie Corbett	17–27	3–11	9th	
1999	Debbie Corbett	5–37	1–15	9th	
2000	Debbie Corbett	17–36–1	5–11	8th	
2001	Debbie Corbett	19–40	7–14	6th	
2002	Bridget Orchard	14–43	3–18	T–7th	
2003	Bridget Orchard	37–19	10–6	4th	
2004	Bridget Orchard	35–24–1	8–6	4th	
2005	Bridget Orchard	38–16	15–1	1st	
2006	Bridget Orchard	37–23	13–5	3rd	
2007	Bridget Orchard	39–20	16–4	2nd	
2008	Bridget Orchard	36–30	11–9	4th	
2009	Bridget Orchard	37–22	13–7	4th	
2010	Bridget Orchard	49–12	16–2	2nd	NCAA Regionals
2011	Bridget Orchard	42–18	16–4	1st	NCAA Regionals
2012	Bridget Orchard	32–26	14–6	2nd	
2013	Bridget Orchard	36–23	15–7	T–2nd	NCAA Regionals
2014	Bridget Orchard	36–20	13–3	1st	NCAA Regionals
2015	Bridget Orchard	38–20	17–5	3rd	NCAA Regionals
2016	Bridget Orchard	39–21	18–4	1st	NCAA Regionals
2017	Bridget Orchard	46–17	18–5	1st	NCAA Regionals
2018	Bridget Orchard	33–23	18–4	2nd	NCAA Regionals
2019	Melissa Inouye	29–26	16–6	1st	NCAA Regionals
2020	Melissa Inouye	7–13	0–0	N/A	Season cut short due to COVID-19 pandemic
2021	Melissa Inouye	38–10	17–3	3rd	
2022	Melissa Inouye	30–23	15–8	2nd	NCAA Regionals
2023	Melissa Inouye	20–28	11–10	5th	
2024	Melissa Inouye	0–0	0–0		
Total:		926–899–4 (.507)			
National champion Postseason invitational champion Conference regular season champion Conference regular season and conference tournament champion Division regular season champion Division regular season and conference tournament champion Conference tournament champion

== See also ==
- List of NCAA Division I softball programs
