= 2015 Big East Conference softball tournament =

- Teams: 4
- Format: Single-elimination tournament
- Finals site: The Ballpark at Rosemont; Rosemont, Illinois
- Champions: St. John's (1st title)
- Winning coach: Amy Kvilhaug (1st title)
- MVP: Krista Puga (St. John's)
- Television: FS2

2015 Big East Conference softball standings
	Conf.				Overall
Team	W		L	PCT	W		L	PCT
St. John's ‍†‍‡‍^{y}	16	–	2	.889	28	–	19	.596
DePaul ‍‍‍	13	–	4	.765	22	–	24	.478
Seton Hall ‍‍‍	10	–	10	.500	25	–	28	.472
Butler ‍‍‍	9	–	12	.429	24	–	27	.471
Villanova ‍‍‍	9	–	12	.429	24	–	30	.444
Providence ‍‍‍	8	–	11	.421	16	–	23	.410
Creighton ‍‍‍	7	–	12	.368	22	–	31	.415
Georgetown ‍‍‍	5	–	14	.263	15	–	32	.319
† – Conference champion ‡ – Tournament champion y – Invited to the NCAA tournament As of June 30, 2015; Rankings from NFCA

The 2015 Big East Conference softball tournament was held at The Ballpark at Rosemont in Rosemont, Illinois. The tournament, hosted by DePaul University, ran May 8 through May 9, 2015 and determined the champion for the Big East Conference for the 2015 NCAA Division I softball season. Top-seeded St. John's won the tournament for the first time and earned the Big East Conference's automatic bid to the 2015 NCAA Division I softball tournament. The entire tournament was broadcast on Fox Sports 2. Eric Collins and Brooke Weisbrod served as the broadcasters for Fox.

== Format and seeding ==
The top four teams from the conference's round-robin regular season qualified for the tournament, and were seeded one through four. They played a single-elimination tournament. Villanova claimed the fourth seed by tiebreaker over Butler.

Team	W	L	Pct.	GB	Seed
St. John's	16	2	.889	—	1
DePaul	13	4	.765	2.5	2
Seton Hall	10	10	.500	7	3
Villanova	9	12	.429	8.5	4
Butler	9	12	.429	8.5	—
Providence	8	11	.421	8.5	—
Creighton	7	12	.368	9.5	—
Georgetown	5	14	.263	11.5	—

== Tournament ==
Semifinals
1	St. John's	5
4	Villanova	4
2	DePaul	5
3	Seton Hall	9

Championship
1	St. John's	7
3	Seton Hall	5

== All-Tournament Team ==
The following players were named to the All-Tournament Team.

Player	School
Francesca Carrullo	St. John's
Danielle DeStaso	Seton Hall
Sara Foster	Seton Hall
Tori Free	St. John's
Kali Gardner	DePaul
Tianah Hathaway	Villanova
Morgan Maize	DePaul
Dana Morris	Villanova
Casey Moses	Seton Hall
Krystal Puga	St. John's
Yvonne Rericha	St. John's
Savannah Warren	St. John's

=== Most Outstanding Player ===
Krystal Puga was named Tournament Most Outstanding Player. Puga was an infielder for St. John's.
