= 2015 Butler Bulldogs softball team =

American sports team season

2015 Big East Conference softball standings
	Conf.				Overall
Team	W		L	PCT	W		L	PCT
St. John's ‍†‍‡‍^{y}	16	–	2	.889	28	–	19	.596
DePaul ‍‍‍	13	–	4	.765	22	–	24	.478
Seton Hall ‍‍‍	10	–	10	.500	25	–	28	.472
Butler ‍‍‍	9	–	12	.429	24	–	27	.471
Villanova ‍‍‍	9	–	12	.429	24	–	30	.444
Providence ‍‍‍	8	–	11	.421	16	–	23	.410
Creighton ‍‍‍	7	–	12	.368	22	–	31	.415
Georgetown ‍‍‍	5	–	14	.263	15	–	32	.319
† – Conference champion ‡ – Tournament champion y – Invited to the NCAA tournament As of June 30, 2015; Rankings from NFCA

The Butler Bulldogs women's softball team represented Butler University in Indianapolis, United States. The team competed in the Big East Conference. They opened the season on February 6, 2015, and concluded their regular season on April 21. The season consisted of 46 games and 5 tournaments. The Bulldogs won 22 of its first 45 games and lost 23.

== Results ==
OVERALL	PCT.	CONFERENCE	PCT.	STREAK	HOME	AWAY	NEUTRAL	BATTING AVG
22–23	.489	7–8	.467	+1	5–7	8–9	9–7	.285

Butler Bulldogs Softball 2014–2015 Schedule
Date	Opponent	Notes	Result
February 6	vs. Loyola	Rosemont Rumble	L, 6–5
February 7	vs. Western Illinois	Rosemont Rumble	L, 8–4
	vs. UIC	Rosemont Rumble	W, 3–2
February 8	vs. Samford	Rosemont Rumble	W, 9–0
February 13	vs. Evansville	South Alabama Invitational	W, 3–1
	vs Lipscomb		L, 2–1
February 14	at South Alabama	South Alabama Invitational	L, 9–4
	vs. Oklahoma State	South Alabama Invitational	L, 9–5
February 15	vs. Lipscomb		W, 11–6
February 21	vs. Eastern Illinois		L, 5–2
	vs. IUPUI		L, 8–3
March 1	vs. Indiana State		W, 5–4
	vs. Northern Illinois		W, 3–2
March 11	at Bethune-Cookman		W, 10–3
	at Bethune-Cookman		L, 8–1
March 13	vs. UIC	Central Florida Invitational	W, 5–0
	vs. Monmouth	Central Florida Invitational	W, 7–5
March 14	vs. James Madison	Central Florida Invitational	L, 1–0
	at Central Florida	Central Florida Invitational	L, 5–1
March 15	vs. Fairfield	Central Florida Invitational	W, 4–3
March 18	at Northern Kentucky		W, 13–8
	at Northern Kentucky		W, 11–3
March 21	at Creighton *		W, 4–1
	at Creighton *		L, 7–4
March 22	at Creighton *		W, 7–5
March 25	at IUPUI		L, 7–0
March 28	St John's *		L, 3–2
	St John's *		L, 6–4
March 29	St. John's *		L, 5–1
March 31	Indiana State		L, 8–3
	Indiana State		L, 4–3
April 2	at Providence *		L, 2–0
	at Providence *		L, 11–3
April 4	at Providence *		W, 7–2
April 8	at Notre Dame		L, 8–0
April 11	Villanova *		L, 2–0
	Villanova *		L, 9–2
April 12	Villanova *		W, 5–4
April 14	46		W, 6–4
April 15	Eastern Illinois		W, 8–5
April 18	Georgetown *		W, 8–0
	Georgetown *		W, 8–0
April 19	Georgetown *		W, 4–1
April 21	at Miami (Ohio)		L, 5–3
	at Miami (Ohio)		W, 2–1
April 25	Seton Hall *		TBA
	Seton Hall *		TBA
April 26	Seton Hall *		TBA
May 2	at Depaul *		TBA
	at Depaul *		TBA
May 3	at Depaul		TBA
	Conference: * Home event: Bold		

== Roster ==
Butler Bulldog's Women Softball 2014–2015 Roster
Head coach: Scott Hall

Assistant Coach: Jenna Grim

Assistant Coach: Jack Lewis

Volunteer Assistant Coach: Lindsey Beisser

Athletic Trainer: Aaron Begonschutz

Position
No.
Name
Class
B/ T
High school
OF
1
Krosley Ogden
Junior
L/ R
Pendleton Heights
OF
3
Cassie Rupel
Senior
L/ R
Parkway Central
INF
4
Chelsea Norwood
Sophomore
R/ R
Greenwood
C
7
Riley Carter
Junior
L/ L
Bill Crothers Secondary School
OF/ C
9
Brandyce Sallee
Sophomore
L/ L
Cascade
INF
11
Kristen Boros
Senior
R/ R
Elyria
OF
12
Sarah Gronowski
Senior
L/ R
Neuqua Valley
C/ INF
14
Maria Leichty
Senior
R/ R
Ursuline Academy
INF
16
Alyssa Leichty
Freshman
L/ R
Jacobs
P
17
Kristin Gutierrez
Junior
L/ L
Highlands Ranch
OF
20
Sarah Dixon
Freshman
L/ R
Pendleton Heights
P
23
Mikeila Boroff
Freshman
R/ R
Lakewood Park Christian
INF
25
Audrey Hiner
Sophomore
R/ R
Huntington North
INF
26
Maggie MacBeth
Freshman
L/ R
Perry Meridian
P
27
Kacey Starwalt
Sophomore
L/ L
Matoon
INF
28
Alex Kotter
Junior
L/ R
Lincoln
OF
29
Katelyn Cahill
Freshman
L/ R
Nazareth Academy
OF
30
Christina Martinsen
Sophomore
R/ R
Chatard
P
42
Ambry Turpen
Freshman
R/ R
Mount Vernon

== Seasons ==
Butler Bulldogs (Big East, Atlantic 10, Horizon League)
Year	W-L	PCT	Conference Champion
2010–2011	32–24	.571	Milwaukee Raiders (Horizon League)
2011–2012	28–24	.538	Valparaiso (Horizon League)
2012–2013	22–24	.478	Fordham (Atlantic 10)
2013–2014	24–28	.462	Depaul (Big East Conference)
