= DePaul Blue Demons =

Athletic teams that represent DePaul University

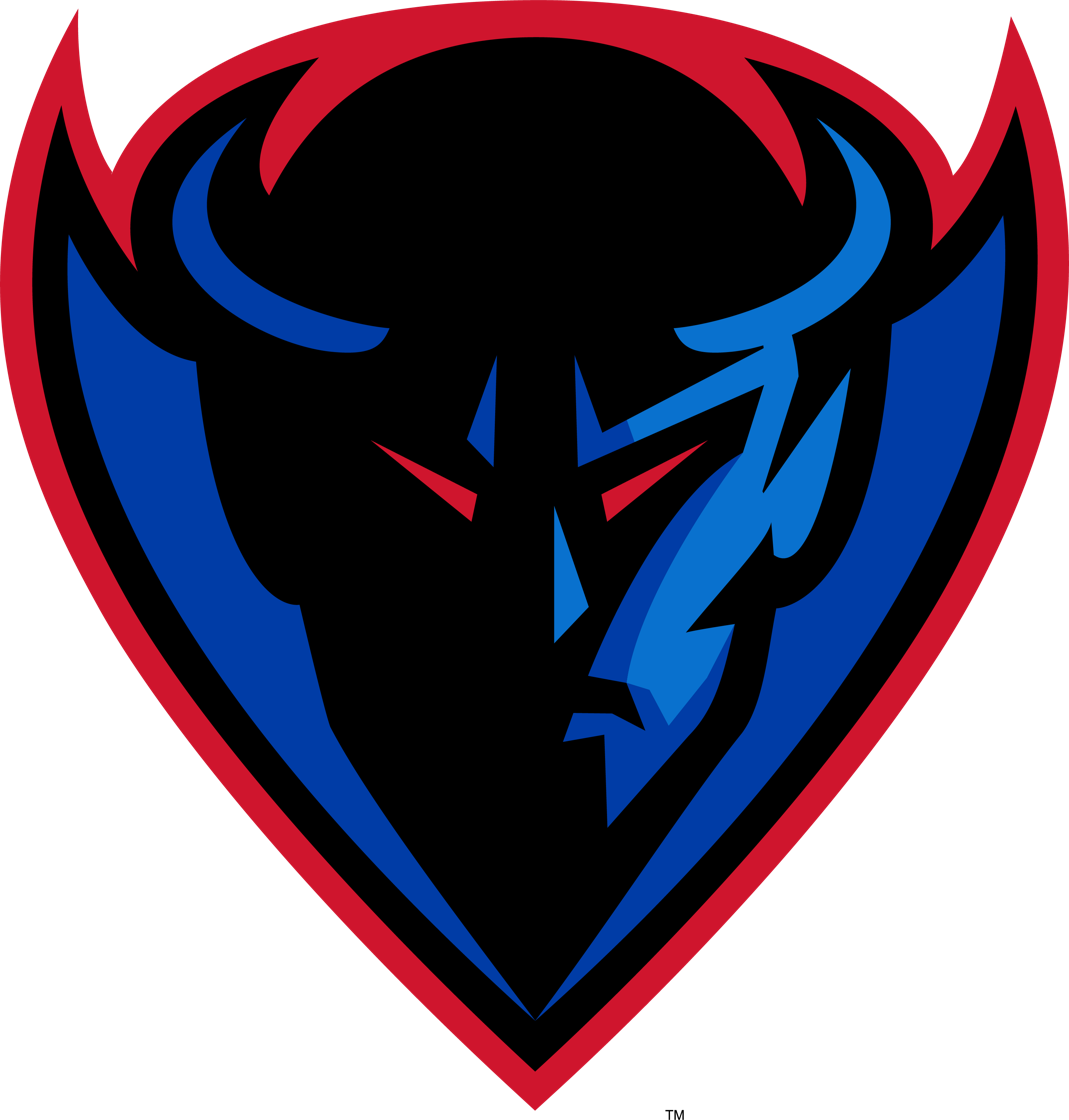
- University: DePaul University
- Nickname: Blue Demons
- NCAA: Division I
- Conference: Big East Conference
- Athletic director: DeWayne Peevy
- Location: Chicago, Illinois
- Varsity teams: 15 (7 men’s and 8 women’s)
- Basketball arena: Wintrust Arena
- Softball stadium: Cacciatore Stadium
- Soccer stadium: Wish Field
- Other venues: Lakeshore Sport and Fitness; Lane Stadium; McGrath-Phillips Arena
- Colors: Royal blue and scarlet
- Mascot: DIBS
- Fight song: "Blue Demons Fight Song"
- Website: depaulbluedemons.com

The DePaul Blue Demons are the athletic teams that represent DePaul University, located in Chicago, Illinois. The Blue Demons participate in NCAA Division I and are a member of the Big East Conference.

DePaul's Senior Vice President & Director of Athletics is DeWayne Peevy, formerly the Deputy Athletics Director for the University of Kentucky Wildcats. Associate Vice President and Deputy Athletics Director Taylor Stapleton, who also came to DePaul from Kentucky, chairs the NCAA Division I Men's and Women's Tennis Committee. DePaul was not affiliated with any conference until it helped establish the Great Midwest Conference in 1991. It subsequently became a charter member of Conference USA from 1995 until its move to the original Big East in 2005 through 2012. DePaul and the other six Catholic, non-FBS schools announced on December 15, 2012, their separation to eventually form a new conference that would carry the Big East name in 2013.

== Nickname ==
The origin of the Blue Demons nickname dates back to 1907 when the university changed its name from St. Vincent's College to its current form. At the time, the athletic teams had red uniforms with a large "D" on the front. After an announcer referred to the players as the "D-men," the moniker stuck and eventually evolved into "Demons." The "blue" was part of an attempt to distinguish the university's players from those of its now-defunct high school, DePaul Academy. The former wore red with a blue "D," while the latter adopted the reverse. The official athletic colors are scarlet and royal blue.

== Sports sponsored ==
A member of the Big East Conference, DePaul University sponsors teams in six men's and seven women's NCAA sanctioned sports.

Men's sports	Women's sports
Basketball	Basketball
Cross country	Cross country
Golf	Soccer
Soccer	Softball
Tennis	Tennis
Track & field^{†}	Track & field^{†}
	Volleyball
† – Track and field includes both indoor and outdoor.

=== Men's basketball ===
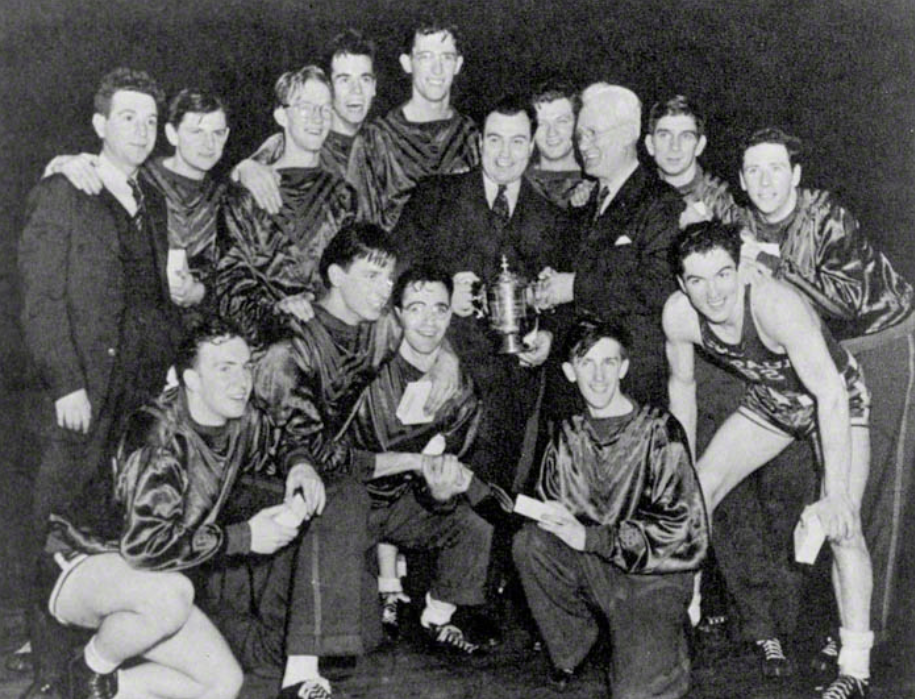
1945 NIT champions

DePaul's NCAA men's basketball team is well known for its basketball program, which gained prominence under Ray Meyer who led DePaul to two NCAA Division I basketball Final Four's in the 1942–43 season and 1978–79 season. Meyer also led the Blue Demons to the 1945 NIT championship during the 1944–45 season. The current head basketball coach is Chris Holtmann, having taken the position in 2024.

The team currently plays their home games at Wintrust Arena adjacent to the McCormick Place convention center.

=== Women's basketball ===
DePaul's NCAA women's basketball team has reached the Sweet 16 multiple times in the program's history. Doug Bruno was the head women's basketball coach from 1988 to 2024. Jill Pizzotti has become the team's new head coach starting the 2025–2026 season.

The team currently plays their home games at Wintrust Arena adjacent to the McCormick Place convention center and select games at McGrath-Phillips Arena.

=== Men's soccer ===
The DePaul Blue Demons men's soccer team represents DePaul University in the Big East Conference in Division I of the National Collegiate Athletic Association (NCAA).

=== Softball ===
Liz Bouck-Jagielski has been the team's head coach since the start of the 2025 season, replacing former DePaul All-American pitcher Tracie Adix-Zins after six seasons.

=== Women's volleyball ===
The DePaul Blue Demons women's volleyball team competes in NCAA Division I volleyball and is part of the Big East Conference.

On September 4, 2026, the Blue Demons hosted the largest indoor women's collegiate volleyball game in state history against the #1 ranked Nebraska Cornhuskers at Wintrust Arena. The event was attended by 8,786 fans. Nebraska would win the game 3-0.

== Former Sports ==
=== Baseball ===
DePaul hosted a varsity intercollegiate baseball team until 1979.

=== Football ===
DePaul hosted a varsity intercollegiate football team from 1898–1938.

== Club sports ==
DePaul offers a number of other intercollegiate club athletic teams under its Department of Campus Recreation.

=== Men's ice hockey ===
DePaul University has an ice hockey club team called the DePaul University Hockey Club that competes in the Division II Northern Collegiate Hockey League Black Division of the ACHA. The team plays a 25–30 game schedule against regional opponents. Home games are played at Johnny's Ice House West in the Near West Side. . In 2009 the team made the ACHA Division II National Championship Tournament for the first time in the team's history. The team has one conference championship from 2023 where they defeated Concordia University Wisconsin in the final.

=== Baseball ===
DePaul University plays as a Division III team within the NCBA as part of District IV-South since the clubs revival in 2020. Reaching their first playoff berth in 2025. The club primarely plays home conference games at the Loyola Academy, Glenview campus.

=== Men's lacrosse ===
DePaul University fields Men's Lacrosse at the non-varsity club level in the Great Lakes Lacrosse League in the Chicago Division. DePaul Men's Lacrosse divisional rivals include: Bradley University, University of Chicago, Lake Forest College, Loyola University Chicago, Northern Illinois University, Northwestern University, Western Illinois University and Wheaton College, as well as other GLLL opponents. The Men's Lacrosse Club play their home games at Diversey Harbor (Chicago Park District) and Montrose Beach (Chicago Park District).

DePaul reached the national stage in 2013 when they reached their first ever MCLA Tournament appearance only to be ousted in the 1st round by the 2012 and 2013 MCLA Division II Champion, St. Thomas Tommies 11–3.

Conference Championships

- 2013: 9–3 (3–1)

National Tournament Appearances

- 2013: 1st Round

Year	Wins	Losses	Conf. GRLC	Play. MCLA	Nat. rank.
2013	9	3	1st	First Round	22
2012	5	5	2nd	--	--
2011	2	6	3rd	--	--
2010	4	6	5th	--	--
2009	6	4	3rd	--	--
2008	4	5	3rd	--	--

=== Men's roller hockey ===
DePaul's roller hockey club competes in the Midwest Collegiate Roller Hockey League, a league within the NCRHA. The team was first started in 2005 and played steadily in the NCRHA for seven consecutive seasons before dropping out of the league for a few years. The team was then reactivated and rejoined the NCRHA in 2014. The current team plays in Division III of the MCRHL.

=== Rowing ===
Gaining formal recognition in 2013, the DePaul Crew Club hosts both men’s and women’s varsity and novice teams.

=== Men's rugby ===
DePaul University currently competes as a non-varsity club in USA Rugby's DII collegiate rugby division. As one of the top collegiate teams in the city of Chicago, DePaul competes in the Great Midwest Rugby Conference formerly known as the WIIL Conference in the Southern division. As famed collegiate rugby writer Alex Goff states, WIIL conference is one of the toughest divisions in DII rugby." DePaul Rugby was the inaugural champion of the THG Chicago Cup. Men's Rugby play their home matches at Diversey Harbor (Chicago Park District).

=== Women's rugby ===
DePaul University's club team is recognized as a DII team by National Collegiate Rugby in the Great Waters Women's Collegiate Rugby Conference. As of 2023, the team is officially recognized as DePaul Women's Rugby.

=== Tennis ===
DePaul University Club Tennis competes regionally in the Midwest League of the USTA's national Tennis on Campus program. They practice and host their home matches at Midtown Athletic Club Chicago, the largest indoor tennis facility in the country in Logan Square. In recent years, the club has taken a lead role in helping to develop the Chicago Tennis on Campus community of schools. In February 2013, they were named USTA Midwest Club of the Year.

=== Men's volleyball ===
DePaul University's Men's Volleyball Club competes at the division 1AA level, hosts and travels to several tournaments per year, competing against clubs from across the nation. The Blue Demons practice and play their home matches at the Ray Meyer Fitness and Recreation Center. In 2011, the Blue Demons finished 3rd at the NCVF National Championships in Houston, TX, their best finish in club history.

=== Water polo ===
DePaul Water Polo is a coed water polo club that was founded in 2013.

=== Men's ultimate frisbee ===
The DePaul Ultimate Club (DUC) is a DI member of USA Ultimate.

== Notable players ==
- George Mikan - Former NBL, BAA, and NBA player. Winner of seven NBL, BAA, and NBA championships. Transformed basketball due to his height, strength, and skill. Led the Blue Demons Basketball team to the 1945 NIT title. Named the Helms Foundation College Basketball Player of the Year in 1944 and 1945.
- Mark Aguirre - Former NBA player. First overall pick of the 1981 NBA draft by the Dallas Mavericks and three-time NBA All-Star. Lead the Blue Demons Basketball team to a final four appearance in the 1978–1979 NCAA season, and was named Naismith College Player of the Year in 1980
- Diana Vines - Former DePaul Women's Basketball player who played from 1985–1989. By the end of her tenure she scored 2,504 career points, which set the school scoring record for both men and women. She also holds the school record for career steals (since records began for the NCAA in 1985–1986) at 359. She was inducted into the DePaul University Hall of Fame in 2005 as well as the Basketball Museum Of Illinois in 2019.
- Rod Strickland - Basketball coach and former NBA player. Received All-American honors and lead the Blue Demons Basketball team to three-straight NCAA Tournament appearances in 1985–86, 1986-87, and 1987–88
- Max Strus - NBA player for the Cleveland Cavaliers Second Blue Demon Basketball player to score over 700 points in a season, along with Mark Aguirre.
- Brianna Ryce - played soccer internationally for Trinidad and Tobago
- Allie Quigley - Former WNBA player who last played for the Chicago Sky. With her, the Blue Demons went to four-straight NCAA Tournaments. She ranks third in the program's all-time scoring list with 2,078 career points. In 2021 she and the Chicago Sky won the team's first WNBA Championship.
- Noelle Malkamaki - Para athlete who set the F46 shot put record at the 2024 Summer Paralympics.
- Lexi Held - WNBA player for the Phoenix Mercury. While at DePaul she made the Big East All-Freshman Team in 2019 and helped the Blue Demons to two Big East Championships in 2019 and 2020.

== Academics ==
DePaul sponsors 15 varsity programs with 232 student-athletes as of the 2025–26 academic year. The department recorded a cumulative grade point average of 3.579 in 2025–26, the second-highest in its history, with every program above 3.0 for the second consecutive year, and 198 student-athletes were named to the Big East All-Academic Team. In April 2026 the department introduced ELEVATE, a student-athlete development program, and renamed its academic advising unit the Center for Student-Athlete Development.

== Athletic facilities ==
=== Current facilities ===
- Wintrust Arena: the 10,000-seat arena is the home of the Blue Demons men's and women's basketball teams.
- Lakeshore Sport and Fitness: Home of the men's and women's tennis teams.
- Lane Stadium: Home stadium for the men's and women's track and field teams.
- McGrath-Phillips Arena: a 3,000-seat indoor arena located in the Sullivan Athletic Center is the home of women's volleyball team since the facility opened in 2000.
- Wish Field/Cacciatore Stadium: Wish Field, which features a FieldTurf playing surface, is home of the Blue Demons men's and women's soccer teams in autumn. Cacciatore Stadium occupies the south end of Wish Field for Blue Demons softball in spring, with its 1,200-seat grandstand situated in the southwest corner.

In September 2023 the department launched the DREAM BIG Campaign to fund facility upgrades, beginning with a renovation of the Sullivan Athletic Center completed in fall 2024. The campaign's centerpiece is a dedicated basketball practice facility that will house practice gyms for the men's and women's programs along with sports medicine, nutrition and strength-training space and a broadcast production studio; construction is scheduled to begin in summer 2026, with completion anticipated in fall 2027. An indoor golf training facility opened in January 2026. The department raised $15.6 million from 2,594 donors in fiscal year 2026.

== Traditions ==
=== Mascot ===
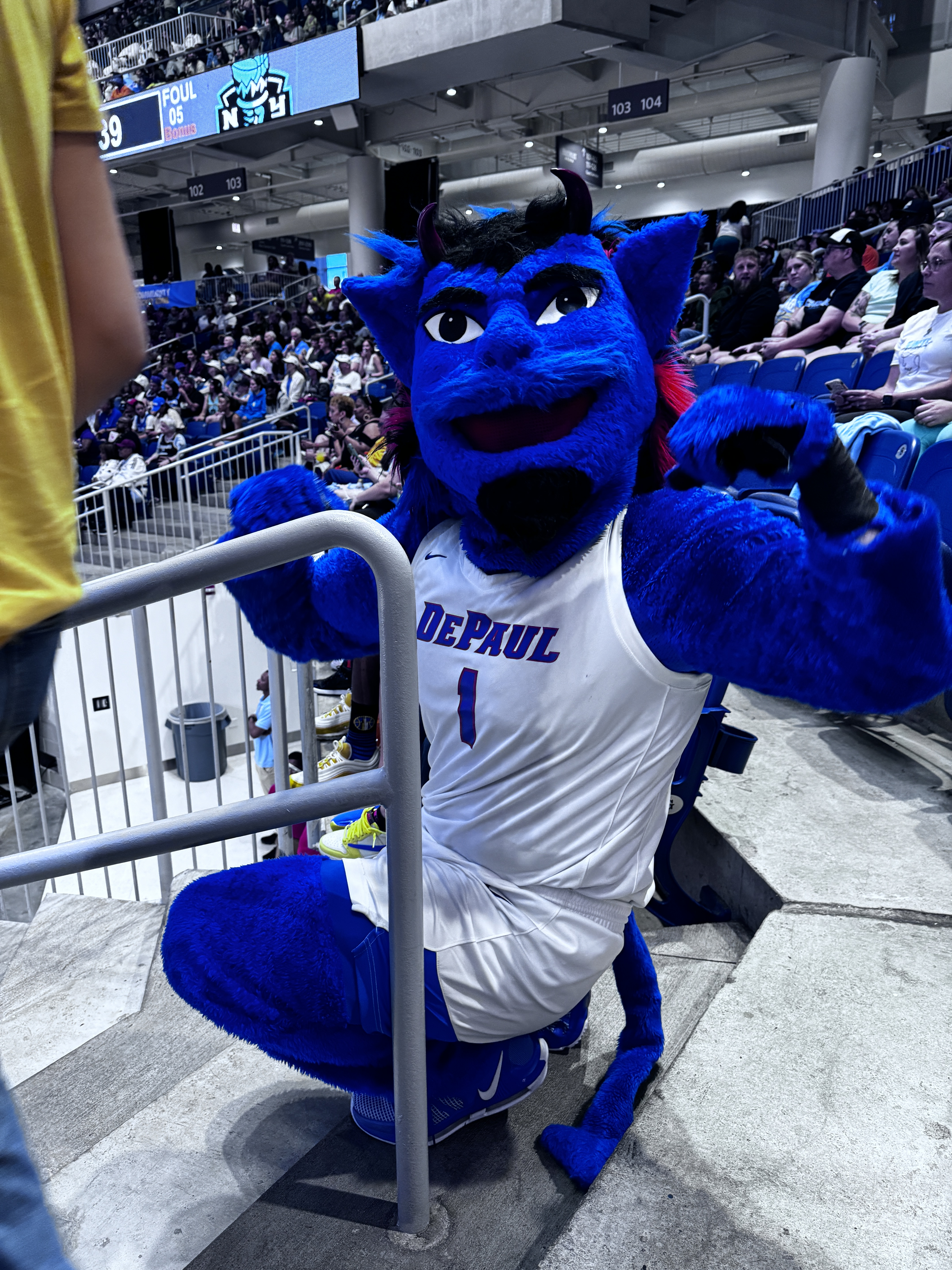
DePaul's Mascot DIBS

DePaul's mascot is DIBS which stands for Demon In a Blue Suit. DIBS is present at every Blue Demons basketball game and makes frequent appearances at DePaul's Lincoln Park Campus and charity appearances around the Chicago metropolitan area. While the Blue Demon nickname has been around for many years, the Blue Demon mascot took the game floor for the first time in 1968 with a papier-mache head and old warm-up suit. Through the years, the Blue Demon has taken on many forms in its evolution and was dubbed DIBS in 1999. Former mascot performers; John Maniatis and Paul Fisher.

=== Former facilities ===
- Allstate Arena — Men's basketball
- Alumni Hall — Men's and women's basketball, Women's volleyball
- Soldier Field — Football
- University Auditorium — Men's basketball
- Wrigley Field — Football
