= Liz Bouck-Jagielski =

American softball coach

Current position
- Title: Head coach
- Team: DePaul
- Conference: Big East

Biographical details
- Born: September 5, 1982 (age 44); South Holland, Illinois, U.S.
- Education: DePaul

Playing career
- 2000–2003: DePaul (Collegiate)
- 2004*: Arizona Heat
- 2004: Texas Thunder
- 2005: Chicago Bandits

Coaching career (HC unless noted)
- 2004–2011: DePaul (Grad. asst.)
- 2012: Northern Illinois (Vol. asst.)
- 2024: Roosevelt (asst.)
- 2025–present: DePaul

Head coaching record
- Overall: 36-62 (.367)

Accomplishments and honors

Awards
- Conference USA Player of the Year (2002); Second-team All-American (2002); 2× NPF regular season champion (2004, 2005)

Liz Bouck-Jagielski (born September 5, 1982) is currently the head coach of the DePaul University softball team. She was formally a player for the Blue Demons from 2000 to 2003.

== Early years ==
A native of South Holland, Bouck attended Thornwood High School and played on the Thunderbird's softball team. As a freshman Bouck played on the same team as her older sister Tami, a senior. Tami attended DePaul from 1997 to 2000 where her younger sister would soon follow.

== Career ==
=== Collegiate ===
Bouck attended DePaul from 2000 to 2003. Her career as a player was massively successful as she would help lead the team to four NCAA Tournaments and one Women's College World Series in 2000. She was inducted into the DePaul Hall of Fame in 2019. At the time of her induction, Bouck ranked 3rd all-time in career stolen bases and 4th in both career hits and runs.

=== Professional ===
After graduating from DePaul, Bouck was drafted as the fourth overall pick in the first round of the 2004 NPF Draft to the Arizona Heat. She was then traded to the Texas Thunder for a single season. She would additionally play a single season with the Chicago Bandits as a part of their inaugural season in 2005. In both cases, Bouck would help lead the teams to National Pro Fastpitch regular season championships.

== Coaching ==
From 2004 to 2011 Bouck would return to DePaul and become assistant coach under Eugene Lenti. The two managed to return the team to two more WCWS in 2005 and 2007. In addition to seven NCAA Tournament appearances. For the 2012 season, Bouck was picked up as a volunteer assistant for the Northern Illinois Huskies softball team.

For a decade she coached and mentored high school/local athletes in the Chicagoland area, including the Orland Park A's among others. After a brief stint as an assistant coach at Roosevelt University in 2024, the institutions final year in the NAIA before transitioning to NCAA Division II, on June 11 Bouck was hired by DePaul to become the team's next head softball coach. Replacing Tracie Adix-Zins after six seasons.

=== DePaul ===
Bouck would finish her first season as head coach with an overall record of 16―32 (.333). An improvement seen in comparison to the 2024 season as former head coach, Tracie Adix-Zins, finished 9―39 (.187). The worst in program history. This is in spite of the Blue Demons winning one less conference game than the previous season, going 3―21 (.125) to Adix's 4―20 (.166).

== Head coaching record ==
Record table
Season	Team	Overall	Conference	Standing	Postseason
DePaul (Big East) (2025–present)
2025	DePaul	16–32	3–21	8th	
2026	DePaul	20–30	8–16	T–7th	
Total:		36–62 (.367)			
National champion Postseason invitational champion Conference regular season champion Conference regular season and conference tournament champion Division regular season champion Division regular season and conference tournament champion Conference tournament champion
