= Graduate School of Business =

Graduate School of Business may refer to:

- Colgate Darden Graduate School of Business Administration at the University of Virginia
- Columbia University Graduate School of Business at Columbia University
- Michael Smurfit Graduate Business School at the University College Dublin
- Jones Graduate School of Business at Rice University
- Kellstadt Graduate School of Business at DePaul University
- Stanford Graduate School of Business at Stanford University
- University of Chicago Graduate School of Business at the University of Chicago
