= DePaul Art Museum =

Museum in Chicago, Illinois

DePaul Art Museum (DPAM)
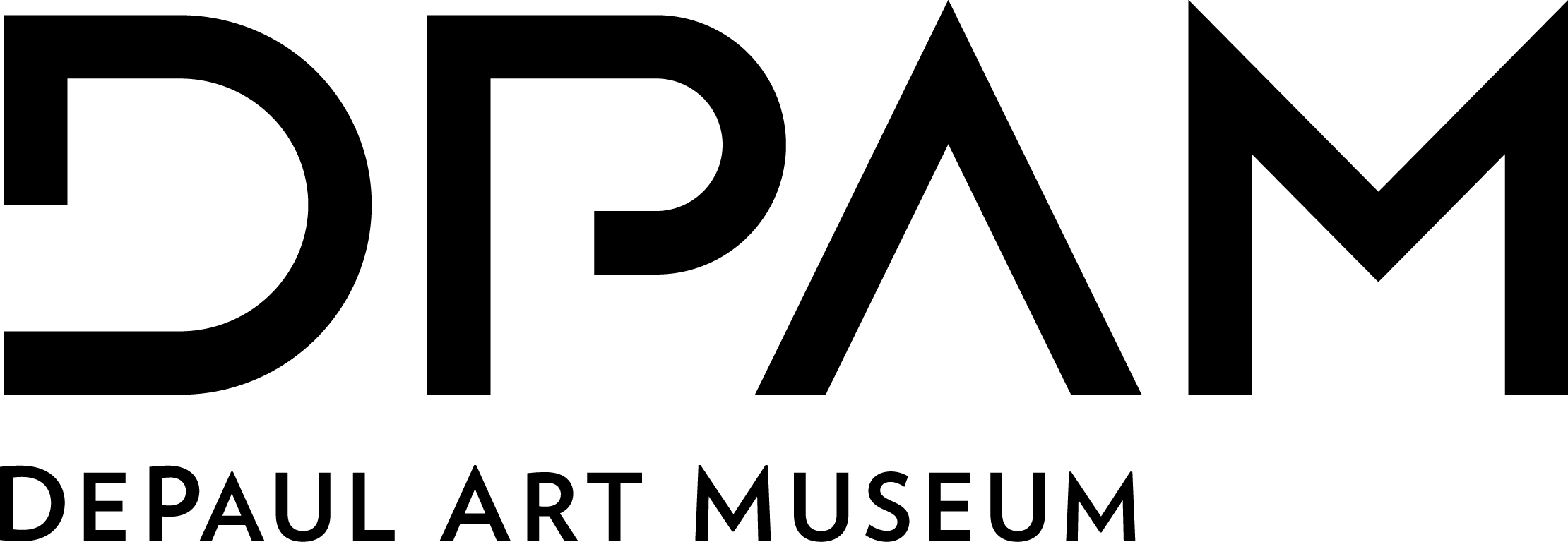
- Established: 1985
- Location: 935 West Fullerton Avenue, Chicago, Illinois (2011―2026)
- Coordinates: 41.92523°N 87.65252°W
- Type: Art museum
- Director: Laura-Caroline de Lara
- Public transit access: Fullerton (CTA) - Red Line, Brown Line, Purple Line
- Website: resources.depaul.edu/art-museum/Pages/default.aspx

The DePaul Art Museum (DPAM) is a university art museum located on the campus of DePaul University in Chicago, Illinois. The permanent collection has nearly 4,000 objects that include paintings, photographs, and sculptures. The museum was officially closed to the public on June 30, 2026, but remains available to students via appointment.

== History ==
Despite collecting art since the founding of the institution in 1898, DePaul University began assembling a permanent art collection in 1972. Officially founded in 1985, the DePaul Art Museum began with no permanent location for its collections. Housing a variety of pieces in classrooms and later the John T. Richardson Library upon its completion in 1992.

In 2011, a new three-story, 15,200-square-foot (1,410 m^{2}) building was completed at a price of $7.8 million, equivalent to $11,200,000 in 2025. The dedicated museum was built alongside the CTA's Fullerton station on DePaul's Lincoln Park campus. The building was designed by Chicago architectural firm Antunovich Associates, Inc.

In February 2026 the university announced that the museum will close on June 30. The decision follows declining international graduate enrollment as well as the rising demand for financial aid. The announcement caused backlash from students, staff, and the community as a whole. University president Robert Manuel stated that the building would not be sold or abandoned, but "repurposed in another way that served students". Since early March, a petition was created by philosophy professor Sean Kirkland that has since received over 3,800 signatures opposing the decision. Provost Salma Ghanem stated in a letter to faculty on April 13 that the university will continue to "maintain and steward the art collection as part of our academic and research offerings".

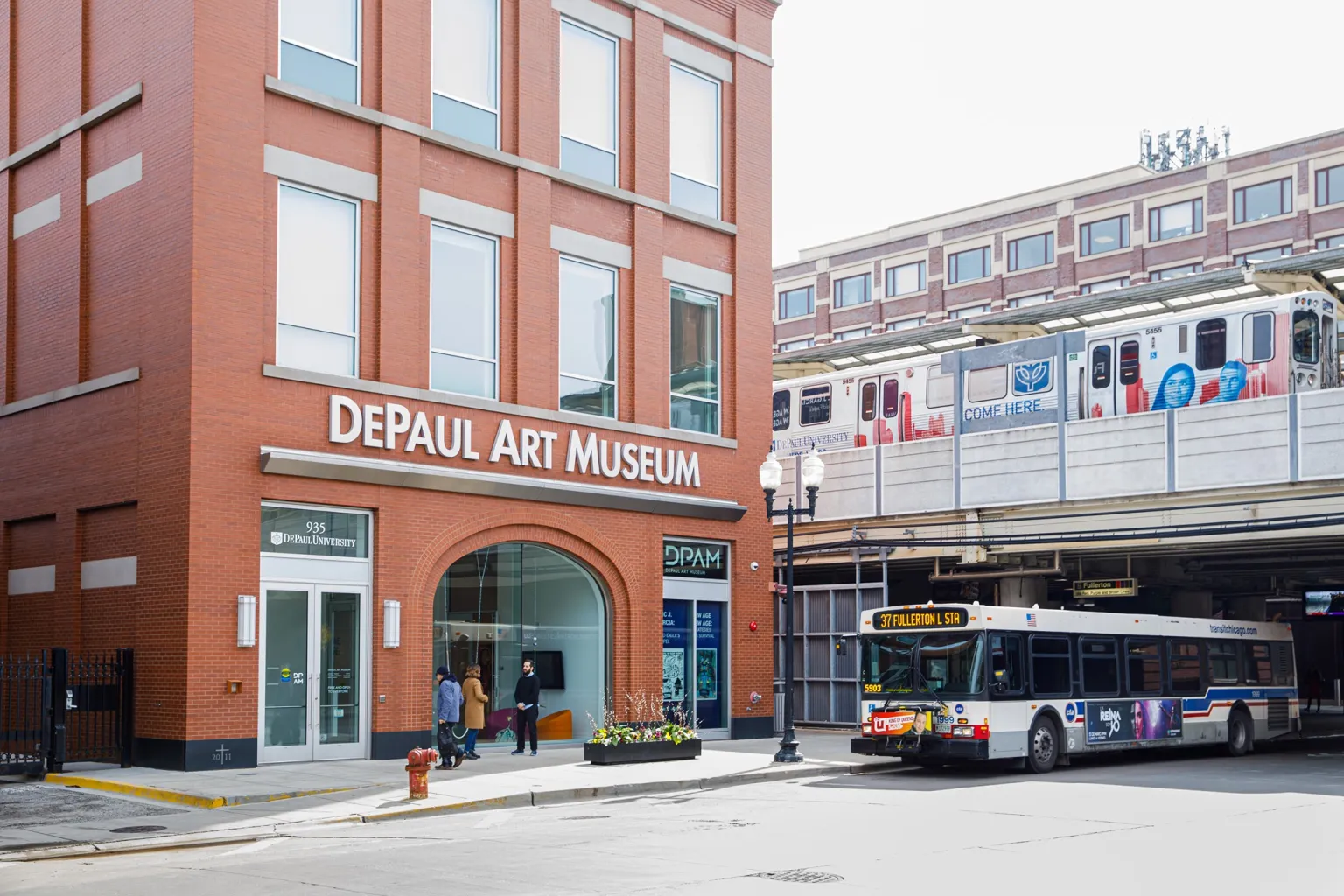
DPAM alongside the Fullerton station.

Despite the efforts of many students, including a final protest by the DePaul Artist Collective on June 11, the museum ceased day-to-day operations on June 30 as scheduled. As the museum is a member of both the American Alliance of Museums and the Association of Academic Museums and Galleries, the facility must continue to steward the collection in an optimal matter. Such as the continuation of climate control systems in the building. Laura-Caroline de Lara, director of the museum for nearly a decade, will remain in charge of the works.

== Permanent Collection ==
The university is in ownership of a vast variety of pieces including that of many Chicago artists and beyond. Mainly contemporary art. This includes works by Chicago Imagists and Monster Roster such as Roger Brown and Christina Ramberg. As well as pieces from other national and international artists such as Andy Warhol and even a 16th-century Spanish oil painting of the Madonna and Child.
