= John T. Richardson =

American academic and priest (1923–2022)

The Reverend John T. Richardson C.M.

9th President of DePaul University
- In office October 31, 1981 – June 30, 1993
- Preceded by: John R. Cortelyou
- Succeeded by: John P. Minogue

Personal details
- Born: John Thomas Richardson; December 20, 1923 Dallas, Texas, U.S.
- Died: March 29, 2022 (aged 98) Perryville, Missouri, U.S.
- Education: St. Mary's Seminary; Angelicum University; St. Louis University
- Occupation: Priest, academic, educator

John Thomas Richardson, C.M. (December 20, 1923 – March 29, 2022) was an American academic administrator and Catholic priest. He served as the ninth President of DePaul University, serving from 1981 through 1993. He began his academic career with DePaul University in 1954, when he served as the dean of the Graduate School until his election as university president. After his tenure ended, he became the university's chancellor, serving until 2017.

== Early life ==
Richardson was born in Dallas, Texas. His parents were Patrick Richardson and Mary (née Walsh) Richardson. He joined the Congregation of the Mission in 1942. He studied at St. Mary's Seminary in Perryville, Missouri and earned a bachelor's degree in philosophy in 1946.

Richardson became a priest in 1949 and received his Doctor of Sacred Theology from the Dominican Angelicum University in 1951. He returned to school in 1954, attending St. Louis University to receive a master's degree in sociology.

== DePaul University presidency ==
Richardson began his career with DePaul University in 1954, when he served as the dean of the Graduate School. He also served as a trustee of the university beginning in 1954 until 1993. In 1981, Richardson became the university's 9th president. He was inaugurated at Navy Pier on October 31, 1981, with Illinois Governor James R. Thompson and Chicago Mayor Jane Byrne declaring that week of October 25 to November 1 as DePaul University Week. One of his first actions was to re-establish the university's student paper after his predecessor disbanded it.

The Center for Urban Education, International Human Rights Law Institute, and Institute for Business Ethics were all founded during his tenure at the university. His administration also oversaw the university's first satellite campus in Oak Brook, Illinois as better education access for adult and commuter students.

During his tenure, the university constructed three student residence halls in Lincoln Park, to help attract students from out of state. When he retired on June 30, 1993, the university had 16,500 students. His successor, John P. Minogue, was named DePaul University's 10th president in September 1993. After his tenure as president ended, Richardson became the university's chancellor and served in this role until 2017. He was later honored as chancellor emeritus.

== Later years and death ==
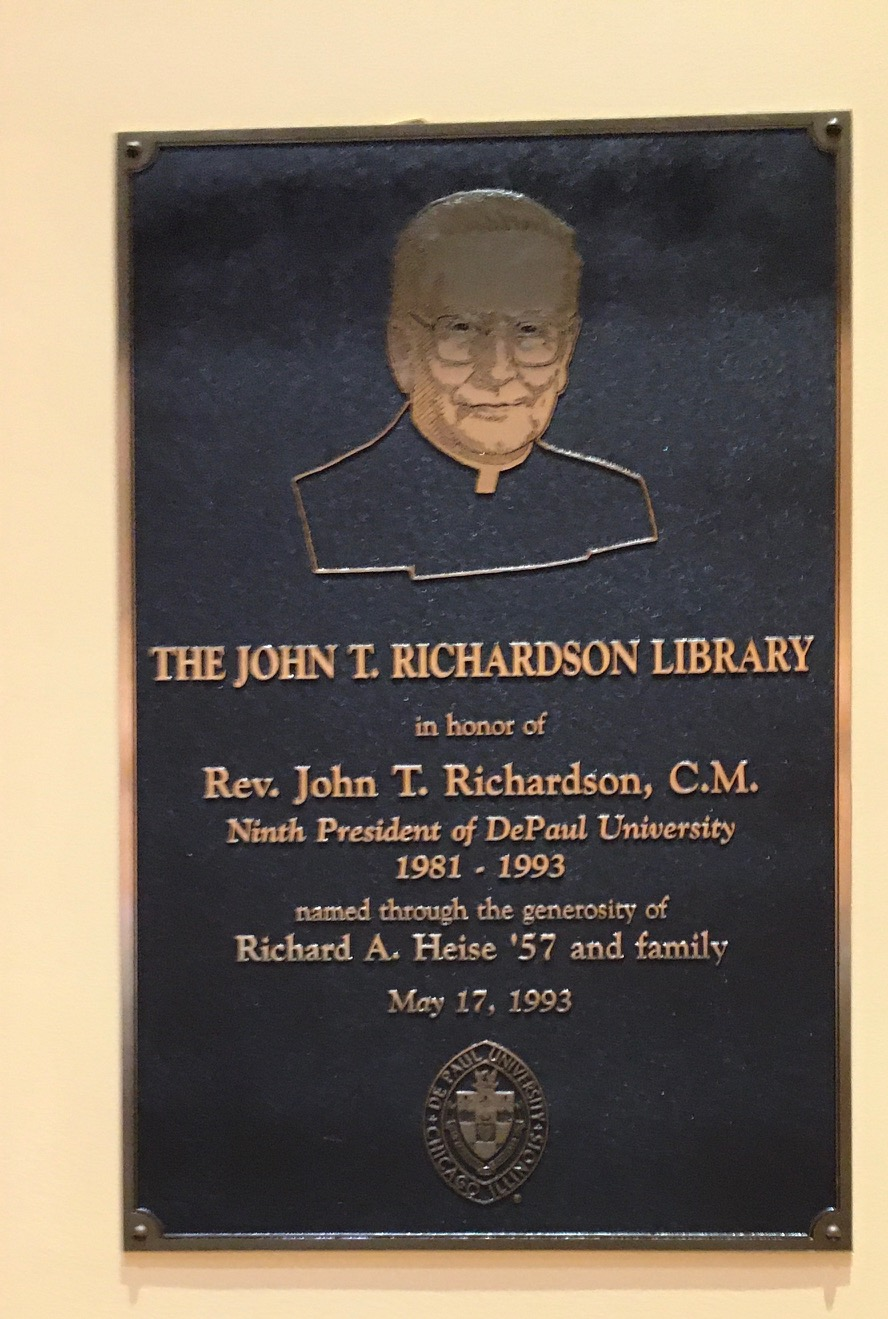
A plaque of Richardson at DePaul University's Richardson Library

After his retirement, Richardson went into academia, teaching various seminarian courses.

Richardson is the author of the memoir The Playful Hand of God (2011), as well as Readings in Catholic Social Teaching (2015), a collection of lectures and documents from his work at Christ the King Seminary.

Richardson died on March 29, 2022, in Perryville, Missouri, aged 98.

== Legacy ==
In 1992, the John R. Richardson Library was opened at DePaul University's Lincoln Park campus.

In 1994, Governor of Illinois Jim Edgar honored Richardson as Laureate in the Order of Lincoln, the highest honor in Illinois for his philanthropy works.
