= Northern Collegiate Hockey League =

- Conference: ACHA
- Founded: 2014
- Commissioner: Dan Wood
- Sports fielded: Men's ice hockey
- Division: Division II
- No. of teams: 11
- Region: Central
- Most recent champions: Marian University (6th title)
- Most titles: Marian University (6 titles)
- Website: Official website

The Northern Collegiate Hockey League (NCHL) is a college ice hockey league based in the central region of the United States. The conference is part of the American Collegiate Hockey Association Division 2 and is made up of eleven teams from universities and colleges based in Illinois, Michigan, and Wisconsin.

== History ==
Former logo of the NCHL. Used until the end of the 2018–19 season.

The 2014–2015 season was the inaugural season for the NCHL, formed of ACHA D2 teams from Wisconsin, Iowa, Illinois, Minnesota, and Michigan.

== Regular-season format ==
Each conference member is required to play all the other members, for a 16-game conference season. Teams earn two point for a win (regulation or overtime), one point for a tie or an overtime loss, and zero points for a regulation loss.

At the end of the season the top six teams qualify for the conference tournament, with the top two teams receiving a first round bye.

== Member teams ==
Member	Location	Joined league	Nickname	Home arena	Head coach
Aurora University	Aurora, IL	2017	Spartans	All Seasons	Bill Andrews
Concordia University Wisconsin	Mequon, WI	2018	Falcons	Ozaukee Ice Center	Shea Klitzke
DePaul University	Chicago, IL	2017	Blue Demons	Johnny's Ice House West	Sean Hammond
Lewis University	Romeoville, IL	2015	Flyers	CanLan Ice Sports	Jim Swoyer
Marian University	Fond du Lac, WI	2016	Sabres	Blue Line Family Ice Center	Blake Zabinski
Marquette University	Milwaukee, WI	2017	Golden Eagles	The Ponds of Brookfield	Paul Wajgel
Milwaukee School of Engineering	Milwaukee, WI	2023	Raiders	Kern Center	George Sullivan
Purdue University Northwest	Hammond, IN	2021	Pride	Kube Sports Complex	Tom Pauly
Roosevelt University	Bensenville, IL	2014	Lakers	The Edge Ice Arena	Vito Bruno
St. Norbert College	De Pere, WI	2021	Green Knights	Resch Olympic Pavilion	Dan Wood
University of Wisconsin Milwaukee	Milwaukee, WI	2022	Panthers	The Ponds of Brookfield	Gavin Nickerson
University of Wisconsin Oshkosh	Oshkosh, WI	2014	Titans	20th St. YMCA	Kyle Jansen

== Conference tournament format ==
=== Playoffs 2026 ===
Quarterfinals
1	Purdue University NW	8
8	University of Wisconsin Oshkosh	0
4	Lewis University	2
5	Marquette University	4
2	Concordia University WI	8
7	Aurora University	2
3	Marian University	8
6	DePaul University	3

Semifinals
1	Purdue University NW	3
5	Marquette University	2
2	Concordia University WI	2
3	Marian University	4

Championship
1	Purdue University NW	3
3	Marian University	4 (OT)

=== Playoffs 2025 ===
Quarterfinals
Purdue University NW	3
University of Wisconsin Oshkosh	2
Concordia University WI	4
DePaul University	1
Marian University	10
Roosevelt University	1
Aurora University	1
Marquette University	4

Semifinals
Purdue University NW	4
Concordia University WI	3
Marian University	5
Marquette University	1

Championship
Purdue University NW	4
Marian University	5

=== Playoffs 2024 ===
Quarterfinals
1	Concordia University WI	7
8	Roosevelt University	1
4	Aurora University	2
5	Marian University	9
2	DePaul University	4 (OT)
7	University of Wisconsin Oshkosh	3
3	Marquette University	6
6	University of Wisconsin Milwaukee	0

Semifinals
1	Concordia University WI	6
5	Marian University	3
2	DePaul University	7
3	Marquette University	0

Championship
1	Concordia University WI	9
2	DePaul University	6

=== Playoffs 2023 ===
Quarterfinals
1	Concordia University WI	6
8	Lewis University	3
4	Marquette University	4
5	Aurora University	5
2	DePaul University	9
7	Roosevelt University	1
3	Marian University	4
6	University of Wisconsin Oshkosh	1

Semifinals
1	Concordia University WI	9
5	Aurora University	1
2	DePaul University	9
3	Marian University	5

Championship
1	Concordia University WI	4
2	DePaul University	6

=== Playoffs 2022 ===
==== Black Division ====
Semifinals
1	Marquette University	6
4	DePaul University	3
2	Marian University	5
3	Concordia University WI	2

Championship
1	Marquette University	3
2	Marian University	8

==== Orange Division ====
Semifinals
1	Purdue University Northwest	6
4	St. Norbert College	1
2	University of Wisconsin Oshkosh	7
3	Northern Michigan University	4

Championship
1	Purdue University Northwest	4
2	University of Wisconsin Oshkosh	5 (OT)

=== Playoffs 2020 ===
Quarterfinals
4	Marquette University	9
5	Lewis University	3
3	Concordia University WI	4
6	DePaul University	1

Semifinals
1	Marian University	2
4	Marquette University	1
2	Aurora University	4
3	Concordia University WI	5 (OT)

Championship
1	Marian University	4 (OT)
3	Concordia University WI	3

=== Playoffs 2019 ===
Quarterfinals
4	Robert Morris University	6
5	DePaul University	1
3	Marquette University	7
6	University of Wisconsin Oshkosh	4

Semifinals
1	Marian University	5
4	Robert Morris University	0
2	Aurora University	3
3	Marquette University	2

Championship
1	Marian University	3
2	Aurora University	2

=== Playoffs 2018 ===
Quarterfinals
4	University of Wisconsin Oshkosh	0
5	Robert Morris University	2
3	St. Mary's University of MN	4 (SO)
6	DePaul University	4

Semifinals
1	Aurora University	4
4	Robert Morris University	2
2	Marian University	5
3	St. Mary's University of MN	3

Championship
1	Aurora University	4
2	Marian University	2

=== Playoffs 2017 ===
Quarterfinals
4	University of Wisconsin Oshkosh	5
5	Lewis University	2
3	Robert Morris University	8
6	St. Mary's University of MN	0

Semifinals
1	Marian University	8
4	University of Wisconsin Oshkosh	1
2	Waldorf University	7
3	Robert Morris University	3

Championship
1	Marian University	5
2	Waldorf University	2

=== Playoffs 2016 ===
Quarterfinals
4	University of Wisconsin Oshkosh	6
5	Northern Michigan University	3
3	Waldorf University	3
6	St. Mary's University of MN	0

Semifinals
1	Lewis University	4
4	University of Wisconsin Oshkosh	5 (2OT)
2	Robert Morris University	2
3	Waldorf University	1

Championship
4	University of Wisconsin Oshkosh	2
2	Robert Morris University	4

=== Playoffs 2015 ===
Quarterfinals
4	Michigan Tech University	3
5	University of Wisconsin Oshkosh	1
3	University of Minnesota Duluth	4
6	St. Mary's University of MN	2

Semifinals
1	Waldorf University	7
4	Michigan Tech University	0
2	Robert Morris University	8
3	University of Minnesota Duluth	3

Championship
1	Waldorf University	3
2	Robert Morris University	1

== Conference champions (Hap Cup) ==
Season	Champion	Runner-Up	Championship Location	Host
2026-27	TBD	TBD	Brookfield, WI	Marquette University
2025-26	Marian University	Purdue University Northwest	Fond du Lac, WI	Marian University
2024-25	Marian University	Purdue University Northwest	Fond du Lac, WI	Marian University
2023-24	Concordia University	DePaul University	Fond du Lac, WI	Marian University
2022-23	DePaul University	Concordia University	Fond du Lac, WI	Marian University
2021-22	Marian University	Marquette University	Fond du Lac, WI	Marian University
2020-21	Season Cancelled Due to COVID			
2019-20	Marian University	Concordia University	Fond du Lac, WI	Marian University
2018-19	Marian University	Aurora University	Fond du Lac, WI	Marian University
2017-18	Aurora University	Marian University	Beaver Dam, WI	University of Wisconsin Oshkosh
2016-17	Marian University	Robert Morris University	Albert Lea, MN	Waldorf University
2015-16	Robert Morris University	University of Wisconsin Oshkosh	Marquette, MI	Northern Michigan University
2014-15	Waldorf University	Robert Morris University	Albert Lea, MN	Waldorf University

Championship totals

Team	Titles	Years
Marian University	6	2026, 2025, 2022, 2020, 2019, 2017
Concordia University	1	2024
DePaul University	1	2023
Aurora University	1	2018
Robert Morris University	1	2016
Waldorf University	1	2015

== Season awards ==
Season	Player of the Year	School	Rookie of the Year	School	Coach of the Year	School
2025-26	Charlie Emme	Concordia University Wisconsin	Will Mullooly	St. Norbert College	Tom Pauly	Purdue University Northwest
2024-25	Tommy Cassel	Concordia University Wisconsin	Jackson Sweeney	Marian University	Blake Zabinski	Marian University
2023-24	Ian Malcolmson	Concordia University Wisconsin	Charlie Emme	Concordia University Wisconsin	Shea Klitzke	Concordia University Wisconsin
2022-23	Michael Helf	DePaul University	Chris Lee	DePaul University	Dan Wood	DePaul University
2021-22	Patrick Sweeney	Marquette University	Garrett Wilderman	Concordia University Wisconsin	Chris Fredrickson & Dan Wood	Marian University & Concordia University Wisconsin
2019-20	Jonathan Grodzki	Concordia University Wisconsin	Mack Willy	Concordia University Wisconsin	Chris Fredrickson	Marian University
2018-19	Conor Coyne & Justin Davidson	Marquette University & Marian University	Zach Tykocki	Aurora University	Will Jurgensen	Marquette University
2017-18	Tommy Feldman	DePaul University	Matt Ernsting	Lewis University	Don Cada	St. Mary's University of MN
2016-17	Joey Daniels	Robert Morris University - Maroon	Miles Giorgione	Marian University	Billy Karr	Robert Morris University - Maroon
2015-16	Tony Francois	University of Wisconsin Oshkosh	Jason Johnson	University of Wisconsin Oshkosh	Chris Huebel	University of Wisconsin Oshkosh
2014-15	Ronald Paulson	Waldorf University	Ronald Paulson	Waldorf University	Brett Shelanski	Waldorf University

== National championship qualifiers ==
- Concordia University WI (2024, 2023)
- Marian University (2019)
- Aurora University (2018)

== National Player of the Year ==
- Charles Emme, Concordia University WI (2024)

== Previous members ==
- University of Minnesota Duluth (2014–16)
- Michigan Tech University (2014–16)
- Waldorf University (2014–17)
- St. Mary's University of MN (2014–18)
- St. Norbert College (2021–23)
- Purdue University Northwest (2021–22, 2024-26)
- Northern Michigan University (2014–2023)
