= Tracie Adix-Zins =

American softball coach

Current position
- Title: Head coach
- Team: Elmhurst
- Conference: CCIW
- Record: 17–55–1 (.239)

Biographical details
- Born: 1985 (age 40–41); Edmonds, Washington, U.S.
- Education: DePaul, South Dakota State

Playing career
- 2004–2007: DePaul

Coaching career (HC unless noted)
- 2008–2009: SD State (Grad. asst.)
- 2010–2014: Wisconsin (asst.)
- 2015: Oklahoma State (asst.)
- 2016–2018: NC State (asst.)
- 2019–2024: DePaul
- 2025–present: Elmhurst

Head coaching record
- Overall: 142-188-1 (.431)

Accomplishments and honors

Awards
- Second-team All-American (2007); Big East pitcher of the Year (2007); Big East tournament champions (2019); Big East regular season champions (2021)

Tracie Adix-Zins (born 1985) is currently the head coach of the Elmhurst University softball team. She was formerly the head coach at Depaul University from 2019 to 2024 and a player for the Blue Demons from 2004 to 2007.

== Early years ==
A native of Edmonds, Washington, Adix attended Edmonds-Woodway High School and played for the Warrior's softball team from 2000 to 2003. There she would also play on the basketball and volleyball team. She was inducted into the school's Hall of Fame as part of the Class of 2022.

== Collegiate ==
Adix attended DePaul from 2004 to 2007 playing as a pitcher for the softball team. Her career as a player was largely successful and the 2007 season is seen as her best. Not only did she help lead the Blue Demons to the 2007 Women's College World Series, she managed to achieve the honor of Big East Pitcher of the Year after a perfect 10-0 mark in conference play. Even knocking out the #3 seed Oklahoma in the final round of the Norman Super Regional. Ending the Sooner's season with a successful doubleheader of 3-0 and 7-2.

Graduating from DePaul, Adix would get her Master's degree at South Dakota State University from 2008-2009 in sport pedagogy. Here she would gain experience as a graduate assistant coach.

== Coaching ==
In 2010 Adix was picked up as an assistant coach at the University of Wisconsin–Madison. In her four years she would help lead the Badgers to their first and so far only conference tournament championship in 2013. Her short tenures at both Oklahoma State University and North Carolina State University were largely uneventful yet added to her coaching experience.

=== DePaul ===
Starting the 2019 season, Adix would begin her six year tenure as the Blue Demons head coach. This was after the massively successful head coach Eugene Lenti, who lead the team from 1980-1987 and 1990-2018, achieving a record of 1,236-604-6 (.671). In her first season as head coach the Blue Demons achieved their fifth Big East tournament championship. In 2021 she helped the team reach their seventh Big East regular season title and was a member of the Big East Coaching Staff of the Year. Despite a successful rise during said season, following the suspended 2020 season due to the COVID-19 pandemic, the team would experience increasingly worse records. In 2024 the team would finish just 9―39 (.187), making it the worst season in program history. She was soon fired by the university.

=== Elmhurst ===
On September 10, 2024 it was announced by the Director of Athletics that Adix would become the head coach for the Division III Blue Jays at Elmhurst University starting the 2025 season. The team would go 6―26―1 (.196). Adix is said to now reside in Medinah.

== Head coaching record ==
Record table
Season	Team	Overall	Conference	Standing	Postseason
DePaul (Big East) (2019–2024)
2019	DePaul	35–16	11–5	2nd	NCAA Regional
2020	DePaul	8–12	0–0		Season canceled due to COVID-19
2021	DePaul	22–11	13–1	1st	
2022	DePaul	29–24	16–8	4th	
2023	DePaul	19–32	9–15	6th	
2024	DePaul	9–38	4–20	9th	
Elmhurst (CCIW) (2025–present)
2025	Elmhurst	6–26–1	2–13	9th	
2026	Elmhurst	11–29	5–11	T–6th	
Total:		142–188–1 (.431)			
National champion Postseason invitational champion Conference regular season champion Conference regular season and conference tournament champion Division regular season champion Division regular season and conference tournament champion Conference tournament champion
