= Driehaus College of Business and Kellstadt Graduate School of Business =

Academic unit of DePaul University

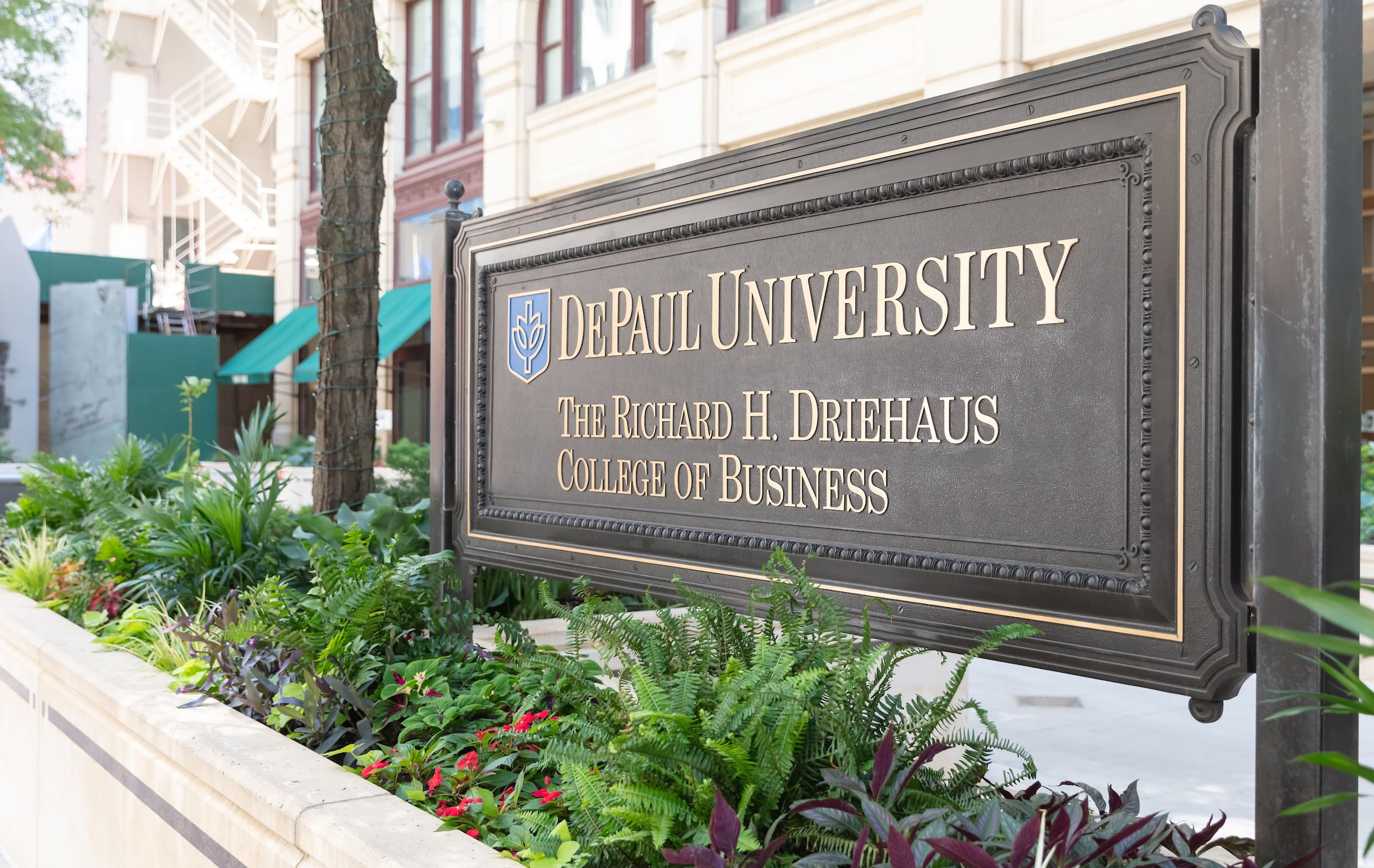
- Type: Business school
- Established: 1912
- Parent institution: DePaul University
- Accreditation: AACSB
- Religious affiliation: Catholic (Vincentian)
- Dean: Sulin Ba
- Students: 5,478
- Undergraduates: 4,013
- Postgraduates: 1,465
- Location: 1 E Jackson Blvd, Chicago, Illinois, 60604, United States; 41.878°N 87.627°W
- Campus: Urban
- Website: https://business.depaul.edu/

The Richard H. Driehaus College of Business (and associated Charles H. Kellstadt Graduate School of Business) is DePaul University's business school.

Known until 2012 as the College of Commerce, Driehaus was founded in 1912 and is one of the ten oldest business schools in the U.S. The school is accredited by the Association to Advance Collegiate Schools of Business-International.

The college's entrepreneurship programs consistently number among the Princeton Review's top 20 entrepreneurship programs. For 2026, the Princeton Review ranked the undergraduate entrepreneurship program #15 and the graduate entrepreneurship program #16.

== History ==
DePaul's College of Commerce began offering business classes in January 1913, becoming one of the 10 oldest business schools in the nation and the first at a U.S. Roman Catholic university. The college established a Master of Business Administration program in 1948 and launched the Graduate School of Business. The college, including the Graduate School of Business, moved to its current Chicago location in the DePaul Center, 1 E. Jackson Blvd., in 1993.

In 1992, DePaul received a $9 million gift from the Kellstadt Foundation to establish the Kellstadt Graduate School of Business, named for Charles H. Kellstadt, former president, chairman and chief executive officer of Sears, Roebuck and Co.

In 2012, DePaul alumnus Richard H. Driehaus gave DePaul a $30 million gift to be used to recruit and retain business faculty. DePaul renamed the College of Commerce the Driehaus College of Business. Part of the Driehaus College of Business, the Kellstadt Graduate School of Business retained its name.

== Academics ==
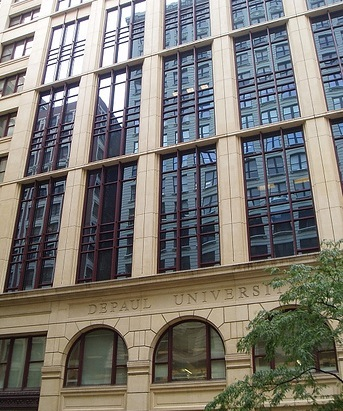
The Driehaus College of Business and Kellstadt Graduate School of Business at State and Jackson in the Chicago Loop.

Driehaus has six divisions: the School of Accountancy and Management Information Systems; the School of Hospitality and Sports Business; and the departments of finance and real estate, management and entrepreneurship, marketing and economics.

=== Undergraduate Programs ===
Students can choose from among 15 Bachelor of Science in Business degree programs, including degrees in entrepreneurship, sports business, digital marketing, and more.

A revised Bachelor of Science in Business core curriculum debuted in fall 2022. Entrepreneurial thinking, technology and social good are the cornerstones of the new core curriculum. As part of the core curriculum, all students participate in the Driehaus Cup: a fast-paced pitch competition judged by industry experts with thousands of dollars in scholarship money at stake. In October 2023, the Mid-American Business Deans' Association honored the Driehaus Cup with its curricular innovation award.

==== Global learning ====
Faculty-led, short-term study abroad trips take students to destinations as varied as Brazil, Spain, Malaysia, the UK, Argentina, and more. In addition to cultural immersion, students get firsthand perspectives on global business from site visits and panels.

=== Graduate Programs ===
==== MBA Programs ====
The DePaul MBA is offered in two modalities. Full-time students study in-person in the heart of Chicago. Part-time students attend online from anywhere in the U.S.

Additionally, a corporate cohort MBA offering is available to employees of select corporate partners. Past partners have included McDonald's, Walgreens, and others.

The DePaul MBA incorporates substantial real-world experience. Each core class includes a hands-on project in partnership with a real-world company. Each core class also incorporates AI tools tailored to discipline- and industry-specific use cases. The program's capstone tasks students with devising an entrepreneurial -- or intrapreneurial -- solution to a problem faced by a real-world company.

==== DBA and MS programs ====
Kellstadt also offers a Doctorate in Business Administration program. Designed as a bridge between academia and industry, the DBA program is tailored to senior professionals and those who wish to transition to academia.

Additionally, Kellstadt offers 12 specialized master's degrees that provide in-depth knowledge in a particular area of business.

Multiple combined degree programs allow students to combine an MBA with an MS program; an MS program with an undergraduate degree; or an MBA with another degree from DePaul, such as a JD or an MFA.

==== International programs ====
In collaboration with the Bahrain Institute of Banking and Finance, Kellstadt offers three degree programs in Bahrain: an MBA program and master's programs in finance and human resources. This partnership was launched in 2002, and the MBA program was the first in the Gulf region to be taught solely by U.S.-based faculty.

==== Graduate Career Center ====
The Kellstadt Career Management Center offers personalized guidance exclusive to business graduate students. Offerings include dedicated coaching, networking events (including events specific to degree areas), executive-in-residence networking opportunities, and more.

=== Executive Education ===
The Hay Center for Leadership Development offers a wide range of programs that advance talent development for organizations and individuals. The center offers custom-built programs for organizations who want to develop their talent, cultivate a driven workforce and tackle business challenges.

=== Centers and Institutes ===
Driehaus has 17 specialized centers and institutes that conduct research, host symposia and partner with local, national and international organizations to address issues within various fields. Several of these include:

- Arditti Center for Risk Management
- Business Education in Technology and Analytics (BETA) Hub
- Center for International Business
- Center for Research and Education in Hospitality Leadership
- Center for Sales Leadership
- Coleman Entrepreneurship Center
- Driehaus Center for Behavioral Finance
- Hay Center for Leadership Development
- Institute for Business & Professional Ethics
- Dr. Curtis J. and Mrs. Gina Crawford Institute for Business Technology Leadership
- Institute for Housing Studies
- John L. Keeley Jr. Center for Financial Services
- Kellstadt Marketing Center
- Marriott Foundation Center for Student Development and Engagement
- Real Estate Center

== Rankings and Recognition ==
=== Undergraduate ===
In 2026, U.S. News and World Report ranked DePaul's undergraduate business offerings at #88. This ranking places Driehaus among the top 17% of business schools ranked by U.S. News and World Report -- itself a selective list comprising only the 5% of business schools worldwide to be accredited by the AACSB. This ranking also represents a significant jump from Driehaus' place at 114 on the 2025 list.

Driehaus consistently ranks among the Princeton Review's Top Undergraduate Entrepreneurship Programs:

- 2026: #15
- 2025: #12
- 2024: #10

=== Graduate ===
In 2026, U.S. News and World Report ranked DePaul's Part-Time MBA Program at #68.

Kellstadt's entrepreneurship offerings consistently rank among the Princeton Review Top Graduate Entrepreneurship Programs:

- 2026: #16
- 2025: #15
- 2024: #20

The DePaul MBA program consistently ranks among Poets&Quant's top 30 MBA programs for entrepreneurs.

In 2024, Fortune ranked Kellstadt's MBA program among the Top 50 producers of c-suite executives at Fortune 1000 companies.

In 2024, Intelligent.com, a data-driven higher education journalism website, ranked the master's in business analytics program at Kellstadt among the nine best in the nation.

=== Centers and Institutes ===
In 2023, the Coleman Entrepreneurship Center earned the Nasdaq Center of Entrepreneurial Excellence Award from the Global Consortium of Entrepreneurship Centers, which counts over 200 university entrepreneurship centers from more than 19 countries among its members. The award is given annually to the top entrepreneurship center among universities that enroll more than 5,000 students.

== Notable alumni ==
- Bushra Amiwala, first Gen Z elected official in the United States
- Tom Dillon, senior VP and CFO, McDonald's USA
- Richard Driehaus, CEO, Driehaus Capital Management
- Spero Droulias, senior VP and chief transformation officer, McDonald's Corporation
- Julian Francis, former president and CEO, Beacon Building Products
- Jack M. Greenberg, former chairman and CEO, McDonald's Corporation
- Cory Gunderson, chief operating officer and EVP, Global Solutions, Protiviti
- Leticia Hudsons, founder and owner, Alma Coffee
- Stacy Janiak, Global Deputy CEO, Deloitte
- Laura Kohl, global chief information officer, Morningstar
- Demetrios (Jim) Logothetis, chair, Public Company Accounting Oversight Board
- Marianne Markowitz, president and CEO, First Women's Bank
- Sean McWeeney, FBI agent and founder, Corporate Risk International
- Dan Michelson, founder and CEO, InCommon
- Malik T. Murray, senior vice president, Ariel Investments and Trustee, DePaul University
- Paula Price, independent board director for Accenture, Warner Bros. Discovery, Mondelez International, and Bristol Myers Squibb
- Andrew Raabe, CFO, Lou Malnati's
- Nicole Robinson, CEO, YWCA Metropolitan Chicago
- Jared Smith, co-founder, RXBar
