= Sulin Ba =

Chinese-American academic administrator and professor

Dean of the DePaul University College of Business
- Incumbent
- Assumed office July 2022

Personal details
- Education: University of Texas at Austin (PhD, MS); Sun Yat-sen University (BS)

Sulin Ba is a Chinese-American researcher, academic administrator, and professor currently serving as the Dean of the DePaul University Driehaus College of Business, beginning in July 2022.

== Early life and education ==
Sulin Ba was born and raised in China. She pursued higher education in the United States, receiving a master's and Ph.D. from the University of Texas at Austin in Library and Information Sciences and Management Information Systems, respectively. She completed her undergraduate studies in Library and Information Sciences at Sun Yat-sen University in Guangzhou, China.

== Career ==
Before joining DePaul University, Ba was the Treibick Family Endowed Chair at the University of Connecticut School of Business, serving as the school's first Associate Dean of Academic and Research Support and the executive director of the Connecticut Information Technology Institute from 2014 to 2019. Ba served in various other roles at UConn for over 20 years, focusing on research and state-wide initiatives on entrepreneurship and innovation. Ba started her academic career at the University of Southern California.

== Research ==
Ba's research interests include the design of crowdsourcing platforms, online word-of-mouth, and digital health communities. She has been recognized for her contributions to health IT, online behavior, and internal market mechanisms. Her work has influenced policy-making, including testimony before the United States House Committee on Small Business. Ba has been published in notable journals such as MIS Quarterly, Information Systems Research and Production and Operations Management.

=== Selected publications ===
- Ba, S.; Pavlou, P. A. (2002). "Evidence of the effect of trust building technology in electronic markets: Price premiums and buyer behavior". MIS Quarterly. 26 (3): 243–268. doi:10.2307/4132332. JSTOR 4132332. S2CID 14484596.
- Majchrzak, A.; Rice, R. E.; Malhotra, A.; King, N.; Ba, S. (2000). "Technology adaptation: The case of a computer-supported inter-organizational virtual team". MIS Quarterly. 24 (4): 569–600. doi:10.2307/3250948. JSTOR 3250948.
- Ba, S. (2001). "Establishing online trust through a community responsibility system". Decision Support Systems. 31 (3): 323–336. doi:10.1016/S0167-9236(00)00144-5. S2CID 5832231.
- Luo, J.; Ba, S.; Zhang, H. (2012). "The effectiveness of online shopping characteristics and well-designed websites on satisfaction". MIS Quarterly. 36 (4): 1131–1144. doi:10.2307/41703501. JSTOR 41703501.
