= DePaul Blue Demons softball =

DePaul Blue Demons Softball
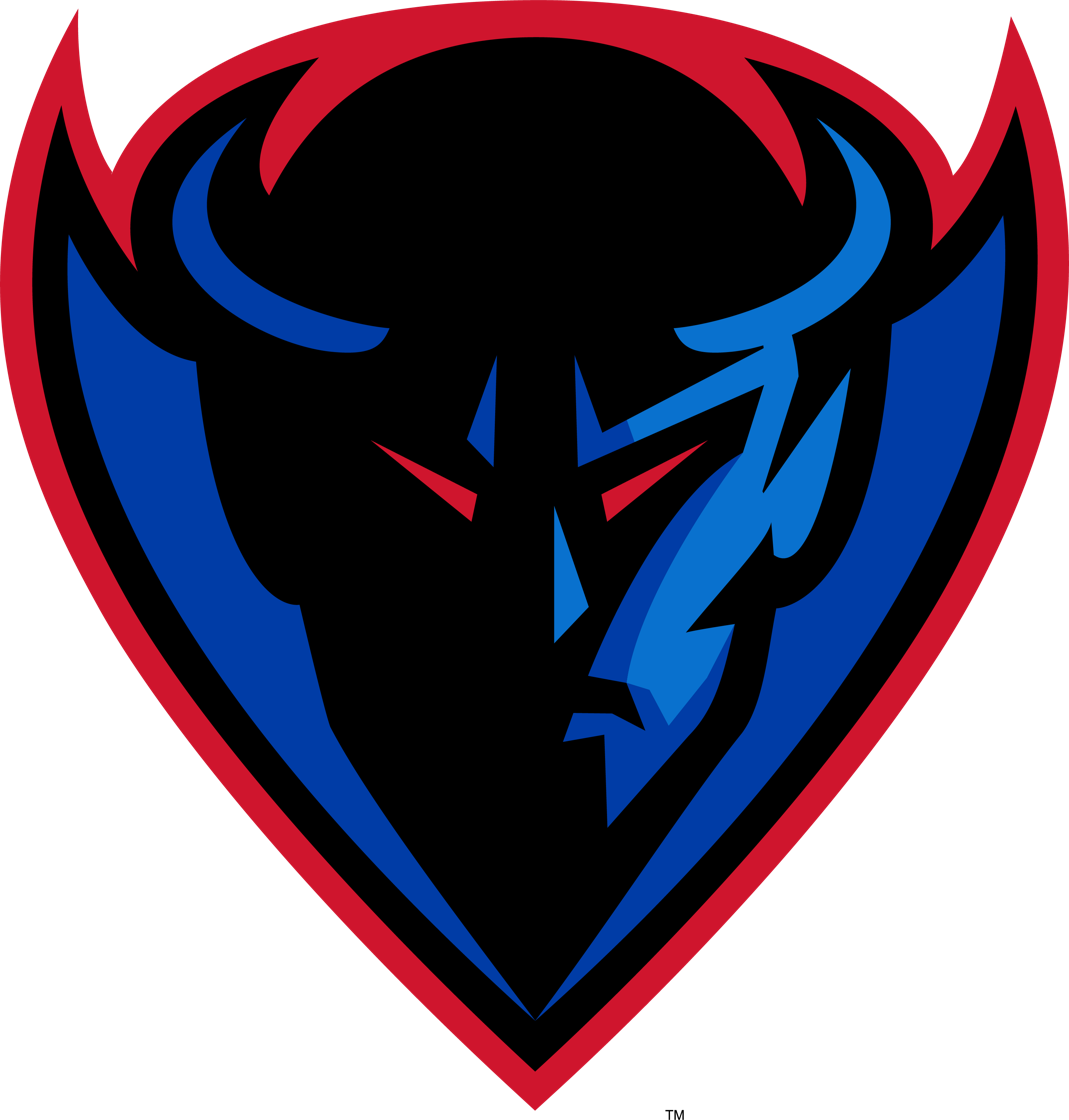
- University: DePaul University
- Head coach: Liz Bouck-Jagielski (2nd season)
- Conference: Big East
- Location: Chicago, Illinois, US
- Home stadium: Cacciatore Stadium (capacity: 1,200)
- Nickname: Blue Demons
- Colors: Royal blue and scarlet

NCAA WCWS appearances
- 1999, 2000, 2005, 2007

NCAA Tournament appearances
- 1994, 1995, 1997, 1998, 1999, 2000, 2001, 2002, 2003, 2004, 2005, 2007, 2008, 2009, 2010, 2011, 2012, 2014, 2017, 2019

Conference tournament championships
- "MCC": 1995, 1997, 1998 CUSA: 2002, 2003, 2004, 2005 Big East: 2008, 2014, 2017, 2018, 2019

Regular-season conference championships
- "MCC": 1995, 1996, 1997, 1998, 1999, 2001 CUSA: 2002, 2003 Big East: 2007, 2009, 2010, 2014, 2016, 2018, 2021

The DePaul Blue Demons softball team represents DePaul University in the sport of college softball at the Division I level of the NCAA. The team has been a member of the Big East Conference (Big East) since the 2006 season. They play their home games at Cacciatore Stadium on campus in Lincoln Park, Chicago, Illinois. The Blue Demons are currently led by head coach Liz Bouck-Jagielski since 2025.

== History ==
=== Early history (1976–1979) ===
Few records were kept during the early days of DePaul's softball run. It is known that Tina Brown, the first Senior Women's Administrator for the women's basketball program, would also serve as the first head coach from 1976 to 1978. DePaul would play its first two games on April 22, 1978, against Northern Illinois and Western Illinois. Ending with substantial losses, 2-10 and 2-23 respectively.

In 1979 Jeannie Lenti would serve as head coach for just the one season while also being the athletic director at DePaul since 1975. Retiring only in 2020 after a 45 year long career.

=== Eugene Lenti era – First tenure (1980-1987) ===
Beginning in 1980, NFCA Hall of Famer and brother of Jeannie Lenti, Eugene Lenti, began his 37-nonconsecutive-year long tenure at DePaul. Following a two-year drought, the Blue Demons would play their only game of the 1980 season on an unrecorded date, losing to UIC 3–6.

The team would soon get some revenge and defeat Northern Illinois in a doubleheader on April 12, 1981. Receiving their first two wins in franchise history, being 6-5 and 4–1. DePaul would see its first full season in 1985 while also managing to achieve its first winning record of (33―18). This trend would continue for 29 consecutive seasons before finally going down to (22―24) in 2015.

=== Phil Cahil era (1988-1989) ===
Coaching only two seasons, Cahil achieved a pleasable record of 62―39 (.613)

=== Eugene Lenti era – Second tenure (1990-2018) ===
Returning to the position in 1990, Lenti would go on to have four seasons with 50 or more wins. Them being 1999, 2001, 2002, and 2008. The 1999 season is considered DePaul's best as the team finished 22―0 in conference play and 54―14 (.794) overall. The team would become ranked #11 in the nation before ultimately being defeated by the later national champions, UCLA, in the 1999 NCAA Semifinal.

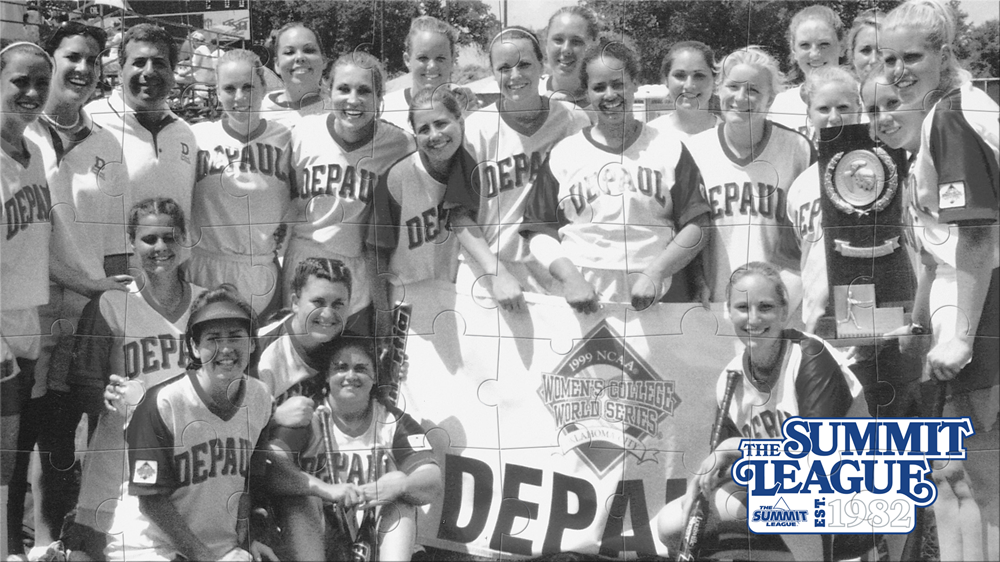
1999 Blue Demons Softball team.

Lenti lead the team to multiple historic streaks for the franchise with an 18-game winning streak in 2014, 19-games in 2001, and the largest in 2007 with 20 straight wins. The Blue Demons became ranked #14 in the nation, however their streak was broken by Loyola Chicago in the teams first success over DePaul since 1995. The team would again fall to the future national champs, Arizona, in the tournament's Second Round, finishing 5th. By 2015 Lenti had become ranked seventh in wins in the history of college softball. His final record at DePaul was 1,236-604-6 (.671).

==== Allegations ====
According to sports psychologist Dr. Jenny Conviser, allegations surrounding Lenti both verbally and physically abusing players, as well as his assistant coaches arose in 2016. Due to DePaul's Title IX and Board of Trustees not following up on said allegations, Lenti was never investigated further and abruptly retired on June 12, 2018. However, in 2019 Lenti announced he was leaving retirement following an offered position by Auburn University. Starting the 2020 season, Lenti became an assistant coach at Auburn.

=== Tracie Adix-Zins era (2019–2024) ===
Beginning in 2019, Adix-Zins would begin her six-year term as coach. Despite a small uptick during the 2021 season, following the suspended 2020 season due to the COVID-19 pandemic, the team would experience increasingly worse records. In 2024 the team would finish just 9―39 (.191), making it the worst (full) season in program history. She was soon fired by the university. She would ultimately become the head coach for the Division III Blue Jays at Elmhurst University.

=== Liz Bouck-Jagielski era (2025–present) ===
After a tenure as the assistant coach at Roosevelt University, it was announced on June 11, 2024, that Liz Bouck-Jagielski would serve as the team's next head coach. She played softball at DePaul from 2000 to 2003 and served as an assistant coach from 2004 to 2011. The Blue Demons managed to finish the 2025 season with an overall record of 16―32 (.421), seen as a major step forward for the ongoing rebuild of the team.
