= 2021 NCAA Division I softball season =

College softball in the United States

- Duration: February 11 – June 10, 2021
- Number of teams: 286
- Preseason No. 1: UCLA
- Defending Champions: UCLA
- TV partner/s: ESPN & ESPN+

NCAA Tournament
- Duration: May 21 – June 10, 2021
- Most conference bids: SEC (12)

Women's College World Series
- Duration: June 3–10, 2021
- Champions: Oklahoma (5th title)
- Runners-up: Florida State (11th WCWS Appearance)
- Winning Coach: Patty Gasso (5th title)
- WCWS MOP: Giselle Juarez (Oklahoma)

Seasons
- ← 2020 2022 →

The 2021 NCAA Division I Softball season, play of college softball in the United States organized by the National Collegiate Athletic Association (NCAA) at the Division I level, began in February 2021. The season progressed through the regular season, many conference tournaments and championship series, and concluded with the 2021 NCAA Division I softball tournament and 2021 Women's College World Series. The Women's College World Series, consisted of the eight remaining teams in the NCAA Tournament was held in Oklahoma City at USA Softball Hall of Fame Stadium, and ended on June 10, 2021.

== Realignment ==
=== For 2021 season ===
- Four schools began transitions from NCAA Division II to Division I on July 1, 2020.
  - Bellarmine joined D-I for softball and all other sports as a new member of the ASUN Conference.
  - Dixie State and Tarleton State joined the Western Athletic Conference (WAC).
  - UC San Diego, already a de facto D-I member in women's water polo and men's volleyball (which do not have D-II championship events) as an associate member of the Big West Conference, moved the rest of its athletic program to the Big West.
- La Salle dropped softball after this season.
- Cal State Bakersfield moved from the WAC to the Big West.

=== Future moves ===
The following conference moves for the 2022 season were announced:

- Five schools left the Southland Conference. Abilene Christian, Lamar, Sam Houston, and Stephen F. Austin moved to the WAC, and Central Arkansas left for the ASUN.
- The Mid-Eastern Athletic Conference lost three members. Bethune–Cookman and Florida A&M joined the Southwestern Athletic Conference, and North Carolina A&T went to the Big South Conference.
- The Ohio Valley Conference saw Eastern Kentucky and Jacksonville State also join the ASUN.
- The Summit League gained St. Thomas from NCAA Division III's Minnesota Intercollegiate Athletic Conference after the reception of a waiver for a direct transition to D-I.

== Season outlook ==
USA Today / NFCA DI Coaches Poll
Ranking	Team
1	UCLA
2	Washington
3	Arizona
4	Oklahoma
5	LSU
6	Texas
7	Florida
8	Alabama
9	Louisiana
10	Oregon
11	Oklahoma State
12	Florida State
13	Kentucky
14	Georgia
15	Virginia Tech
16	Arizona State
17	Michigan
18	Arkansas
19	South Carolina
20	Mississippi State
21	UCF
22	Baylor
23	Missouri
24	Minnesota
25	Duke

ESPN.com/USA Softball Collegiate Poll
Ranking	Team
1	UCLA
2	Washington
3	Arizona
4	Oklahoma
5	LSU
6	Florida
7	Texas
8	Alabama
9	Louisiana
10	Oklahoma State
11	Oregon
12	Florida State
13	Kentucky
14	Georgia
15	Arizona State
16	Virginia Tech
17	Michigan
18	Baylor
19	South Carolina
20	Minnesota
21	Arkansas
22	Mississippi State
23	Tennessee
24	Missouri
25	UCF

D1Softball
Ranking	Team
1	UCLA
2	Oklahoma
3	Washington
4	Arizona
5	LSU
6	Florida
7	Louisiana
8	Alabama
9	Texas
10	Oklahoma State
11	Florida State
12	Oregon
13	Georgia
14	Virginia Tech
15	Mississippi State
16	Arkansas
17	Arizona State
18	Michigan
19	Baylor
20	Minnesota
21	Tennessee
22	UCF
23	Missouri
24	Kentucky
25	South Carolina

Softball America
Ranking	Team
1	UCLA
2	Arizona
3	Washington
4	LSU
5	Oklahoma
6	Florida
7	Texas
8	Louisiana
9	Alabama
10	Arizona State
11	Oklahoma State
12	Florida State
13	Virginia Tech
14	Oregon
15	Georgia
16	Arkansas
17	Missouri
18	South Carolina
19	Mississippi State
20	Michigan
21	Kentucky
22	Minnesota
23	Baylor
24	Tennessee
25	UCF

== Conference standings ==
2021 American Athletic Conference softball standings
	Conf.						Overall
Team	W		L		T	PCT	W		L		T	PCT
No. 23 Wichita State ‍†‍‡‍^{y}	18	–	5	–	1	.771	41	–	13	–	1	.755
South Florida ‍‍‍^{y}	16	–	7	–	0	.696	31	–	19	–	0	.620
UCF ‍‍‍^{y}	16	–	7	–	1	.688	41	–	19	–	1	.680
Tulsa ‍‍‍	15	–	8	–	0	.652	25	–	16	–	0	.610
Houston ‍‍‍	8	–	16	–	0	.333	17	–	33	–	0	.340
East Carolina ‍‍‍	7	–	17	–	0	.292	16	–	33	–	0	.327
Memphis ‍‍‍	2	–	22	–	0	.083	9	–	41	–	0	.180
† – Conference champion ‡ – Tournament champion y – Invited to the NCAA tournament As of May 23, 2021; Rankings from NFCA/USA Today

2021 Atlantic Coast Conference softball standings
	Conf.						Overall
Team	W		L		T	PCT	W		L		T	PCT
No. 18 Clemson ‍†‍‍^{y}	29	–	5	–	0	.853	44	–	8	–	0	.846
No. 2 Florida State ‍‍‍^{y}	26	–	5	–	1	.828	49	–	12	–	1	.798
No. 20 Duke ‍‍‡‍^{y}	26	–	10	–	0	.722	44	–	12	–	0	.786
No. 14 Virginia Tech ‍‍‍^{y}	23	–	11	–	0	.676	37	–	15	–	0	.712
Notre Dame ‍‍‍^{y}	20	–	10	–	0	.667	33	–	15	–	0	.688
Louisville ‍‍‍	15	–	21	–	1	.419	21	–	28	–	1	.430
NC State ‍‍‍	15	–	22	–	0	.405	26	–	25	–	0	.510
Syracuse ‍‍‍	12	–	20	–	0	.375	20	–	24	–	0	.455
Georgia Tech ‍‍‍	11	–	19	–	0	.367	20	–	26	–	0	.435
North Carolina ‍‍‍	10	–	19	–	0	.345	14	–	26	–	0	.350
Pittsburgh ‍‍‍	12	–	24	–	0	.333	17	–	29	–	0	.370
Virginia ‍‍‍	10	–	27	–	0	.270	15	–	33	–	0	.313
Boston College ‍‍‍	8	–	24	–	0	.250	13	–	32	–	0	.289
† – Conference champion ‡ – Tournament champion y – Invited to the NCAA tournament As of June 15, 2021; Rankings from NFCA/USA Today

2021 Big 12 Conference softball standings
	Conf.				Overall
Team	W		L	PCT	W		L	PCT
No. 1 Oklahoma ‍†‍‡‍^{y}	16	–	1	.941	56	–	4	.933
No. 7 Oklahoma State ‍‍‍^{y}	15	–	3	.833	48	–	12	.800
No. 11 Texas ‍‍‍^{y}	12	–	6	.667	43	–	14	.754
Baylor ‍‍‍^{y}	8	–	9	.471	27	–	23	.540
Iowa State ‍‍‍^{y}	6	–	12	.333	34	–	23	.596
Texas Tech ‍‍‍	3	–	15	.167	21	–	26	.447
Kansas ‍‍‍	2	–	16	.111	22	–	26	.458
† – Conference champion ‡ – Tournament champion y – Invited to the NCAA tournament As of June 10, 2021; Rankings from NFCA/USA Today

2021 Big Sky Conference softball standings
	Conf.				Overall
Team	W		L	PCT	W		L	PCT
Weber State ‍†‍‍	15	–	3	.833	25	–	19	.568
Southern Utah ‍‍‍	10	–	8	.556	20	–	30	.400
Montana ‍‍‍	8	–	10	.444	19	–	30	.388
Portland State ‍‍‡‍^{y}	8	–	10	.444	15	–	26	.366
Sacramento State ‍‍‍	8	–	10	.444	15	–	27	.357
Northern Colorado ‍‍‍	8	–	10	.444	12	–	27	.308
Idaho State ‍‍‍	6	–	12	.333	12	–	27	.308
† – Conference champion ‡ – Tournament champion y – Invited to the NCAA tournament As of October 20, 2024; Rankings from NFCA/USA Today

2021 Big East Conference softball standings
	Conf.						Overall
Team	W		L		T	PCT	W		L		T	PCT
DePaul ‍†‍‍	13	–	1	–	0	.929	22	–	11	–	0	.667
Villanova ‍‍‡‍^{y}	15	–	2	–	0	.882	36	–	14	–	0	.720
UConn ‍‍‍	12	–	9	–	0	.571	22	–	20	–	0	.524
Creighton ‍‍‍	8	–	7	–	0	.533	14	–	14	–	0	.500
Butler ‍‍‍	6	–	11	–	1	.361	17	–	21	–	1	.449
St. John's ‍‍‍	7	–	14	–	0	.333	10	–	20	–	0	.333
Seton Hall ‍‍‍	5	–	13	–	0	.278	9	–	23	–	0	.281
Providence ‍‍‍	4	–	13	–	1	.250	5	–	16	–	1	.250
Georgetown ‍‍‍	0	–	0	–	0	–	0	–	0	–	0	–
‡ – Tournament champion As of May 21, 2021; Rankings from NFCA/USA Today

2021 Big Ten Conference softball standings
	Conf.				Overall
Team	W		L	PCT	W		L	PCT
No. 18 Michigan ‍†‍‍^{y}	36	–	6	.857	38	–	8	.826
No. 23 Minnesota ‍‍‍^{y}	29	–	11	.725	31	–	13	.705
Northwestern ‍‍‍^{y}	29	–	15	.659	30	–	17	.638
Iowa ‍‍‍	26	–	18	.591	26	–	18	.591
Indiana ‍‍‍	25	–	19	.568	25	–	19	.568
Ohio State ‍‍‍	24	–	19	.558	24	–	19	.558
Illinois ‍‍‍	24	–	20	.545	24	–	20	.545
Nebraska ‍‍‍	22	–	22	.500	22	–	22	.500
Wisconsin ‍‍‍	18	–	22	.450	18	–	22	.450
Maryland ‍‍‍	19	–	25	.432	19	–	25	.432
Purdue ‍‍‍	18	–	26	.409	18	–	26	.409
Michigan State ‍‍‍	14	–	26	.350	14	–	26	.350
Rutgers ‍‍‍	8	–	36	.182	8	–	36	.182
Penn State ‍‍‍	7	–	34	.171	7	–	34	.171
† – Conference champion y – Invited to the NCAA tournament As of May 23, 2021; Rankings from NFCA/USA Today

2021 Conference USA softball standings
	Conf.				Overall
Team	W		L	PCT	W		L	PCT
East
Charlotte ^{x}‍‍‍	14	–	6	.700	31	–	19	.620
Western Kentucky ‍‍‡‍^{y}	10	–	6	.625	32	–	15	.681
Middle Tennessee ‍‍‍	11	–	8	.579	26	–	22	.542
Marshall ‍‍‍	8	–	8	.500	20	–	12	.625
FIU ‍‍‍	6	–	13	.316	14	–	26	.350
Florida Atlantic ‍‍‍	6	–	14	.300	12	–	35	.255
West
North Texas ^{x}‍†‍‍	18	–	2	.900	38	–	12	.760
UAB ‍‍‍	15	–	5	.750	31	–	19	.620
Louisiana Tech ‍‍‍	10	–	10	.500	22	–	30	.423
UTSA ‍‍‍	8	–	12	.400	15	–	30	.333
UTEP ‍‍‍	5	–	15	.250	11	–	26	.297
Southern Miss ‍‍‍	4	–	16	.200	22	–	31	.415
x – Division champion † – Conference champion ‡ – Tournament champion y – Invited to the NCAA tournament As of May 22, 2021; Rankings from NFCA/USA Today

2021 Pac-12 Conference softball standings
	Conf.				Overall
Team	W		L	PCT	W		L	PCT
No. 2 UCLA ‍†‍‍^{y}	19	–	2	.905	47	–	7	.870
No. 6 Washington ‍‍‍^{y}	18	–	5	.783	45	–	14	.763
No. 10 Oregon ‍‍‍^{y}	14	–	10	.583	40	–	17	.702
No. 12 Arizona State ‍‍‍^{y}	12	–	9	.571	33	–	16	.673
No. 9 Arizona ‍‍‍^{y}	12	–	10	.545	41	–	15	.732
Stanford ‍‍‍^{y}	9	–	12	.429	33	–	22	.600
Oregon State ‍‍‍	7	–	17	.292	20	–	26	.435
California ‍‍‍	3	–	11	.214	17	–	20	.459
Utah ‍‍‍	3	–	21	.125	22	–	33	.400
† – Conference champion y – Invited to the NCAA tournament As of June 9, 2021; Rankings from NFCA

2021 Southeastern Conference softball standings
	Conf.				Overall
Team	W		L	PCT	W		L	PCT
No. 9 Florida ‍†‍‍^{y}	19	–	5	.792	45	–	11	.804
No. 11 Arkansas ‍†‍‍^{y}	19	–	5	.792	43	–	11	.796
No. 3 Alabama ‍‍‡‍^{y}	18	–	6	.750	52	–	9	.852
No. 13 Missouri ‍‍‍^{y}	15	–	9	.625	42	–	17	.712
No. 16 Kentucky ‍‍‍^{y}	13	–	11	.542	43	–	16	.729
No. 15 LSU ‍‍‍^{y}	13	–	11	.542	35	–	22	.614
No. 22 Tennessee ‍‍‍^{y}	12	–	11	.522	42	–	15	.737
Ole Miss ‍‍‍^{y}	12	–	12	.500	36	–	22	.621
Mississippi State ‍‍‍^{y}	8	–	15	.348	35	–	25	.583
Texas A&M ‍‍‍^{y}	8	–	16	.333	32	–	23	.582
No. 8 Georgia ‍‍‍^{y}	7	–	17	.292	34	–	23	.596
Auburn ‍‍‍^{y}	7	–	17	.292	27	–	24	.529
South Carolina ‍‍‍	4	–	20	.167	26	–	26	.500
† – Conference champion ‡ – Tournament champion y – Invited to the NCAA tournament As of June 7, 2021; Rankings from NFCA/USA Today

2021 Southern Conference softball standings
	Conf.				Overall
Team	W		L	PCT	W		L	PCT
UNC Greensboro ‍†‍‡‍^{y}	14	–	4	.778	34	–	17	.667
Western Carolina ‍‍‍	12	–	5	.706	27	–	26	.509
Chattanooga ‍‍‍	8	–	8	.500	13	–	25	.342
Mercer ‍‍‍	8	–	9	.471	24	–	23	.511
Furman ‍‍‍	8	–	9	.471	20	–	28	.417
Samford ‍‍‍	7	–	11	.389	18	–	27	.400
East Tennessee State ‍‍‍	3	–	14	.176	15	–	22	.405
† – Conference champion ‡ – Tournament champion y – Invited to the NCAA tournament As of May 22, 2021; Rankings from NFCA/USA Today

2021 Sun Belt Conference softball standings
	Conf.				Overall
Team	W		L	PCT	W		L	PCT
No. 15 Louisiana ‍†‍‡‍^{y}	21	–	3	.875	47	–	12	.797
Texas State ‍‍‍^{y}	17	–	6	.739	39	–	14	.736
Troy ‍‍‍^{y}	17	–	6	.739	37	–	17	.685
South Alabama ‍‍‍^{y}	13	–	9	.591	31	–	21	.596
Appalachian State ‍‍‍	8	–	12	.400	27	–	19	.587
Georgia Southern ‍‍‍	9	–	14	.391	17	–	26	.395
UT Arlington ‍‍‍	9	–	14	.391	17	–	34	.333
Coastal Carolina ‍‍‍	9	–	15	.375	21	–	24	.467
Louisiana–Monroe ‍‍‍	6	–	15	.286	17	–	32	.347
Georgia State ‍‍‍	3	–	18	.143	16	–	30	.348
† – Conference champion ‡ – Tournament champion y – Invited to the NCAA tournament As of May 23, 2021; Rankings from NFCA

2021 West Coast Conference softball standings
	Conf.						Overall
Team	W		L		T	PCT	W		L		T	PCT
BYU ‍†‍‍^{y}	11	–	1	–	0	.917	38	–	17	–	0	.691
Loyola Marymount ‍‍‍	10	–	5	–	0	.667	22	–	21	–	0	.512
Pacific ‍‍‍	4	–	5	–	0	.444	14	–	14	–	1	.500
Saint Mary's ‍‍‍	4	–	8	–	0	.333	13	–	24	–	0	.351
San Diego ‍‍‍	5	–	10	–	0	.333	13	–	29	–	0	.310
Santa Clara ‍‍‍	5	–	10	–	0	.333	8	–	20	–	0	.286
† – Conference champion y – Invited to the NCAA tournament Pacific suspended their season on May 5, 2021; As of May 21, 2021; Rankings from NFCA

2021 Summit League softball standings
	Conf.				Overall
Team	W		L	PCT	W		L	PCT
South Dakota State ‍†‍‡‍^{y}	21	–	1	.955	43	–	8	.843
Omaha ‍‍‍	12	–	11	.522	20	–	28	.417
North Dakota State ‍‍‍	11	–	12	.478	16	–	29	.356
Kansas City ‍‍‍	11	–	13	.458	29	–	26	.527
South Dakota ‍‍‍	8	–	12	.400	13	–	38	.255
North Dakota ‍‍‍	8	–	14	.364	17	–	33	.340
Western Illinois ‍‍‍	6	–	14	.300	16	–	29	.356
† – Conference champion ‡ – Tournament champion y – Invited to the NCAA tournament As of December 7, 2022; Rankings from NFCA/USA Today

=== Conference winners and tournaments ===
Of the 31 Division I athletic conferences that participated in the 2021 season, all of which sponsor softball, 27 normally end their regular seasons with a single-elimination tournament or a double-elimination tournament. The teams in each conference that win their regular-season title are given the number one seed in each tournament. The Ivy League canceled its softball season due to COVID-19 concerns. Four conferences do not normally hold a postseason tournament: the Big West, Mountain West, Pac-12, and West Coast Conference. Two conferences that normally hold tournaments, the Big Ten and Mid-American Conference, did not do so in 2021. The winners of these tournaments, plus the Big Ten, Big West, MAC, Mountain West, Pac-12, and WCC regular-season champions, received automatic invitations to the 2021 NCAA Division I softball tournament.

Conference	Regular Season Winner	Conference Player of the Year	Conference Pitcher of the Year	Conference Coach of the Year	Conference Tournament	Tournament Venue • City	Tournament Winner
America East Conference	UMBC	Courtney Cashman, UMass Lowell	Courtney Coppersmith, UMBC	Chris Kuhlmeyer, UMBC	2021 America East Conference softball tournament	The Diamond at UMBC • Arbutus, MD	UMBC
American Athletic Conference	Wichita State	Sydney McKinney, Wichita State	Georgina Corrick, South Florida	Wichita State (Note: The American's annual coaching award is presented to a coaching staff instead of a head coach, and is styled as the "Coaching Staff of the Year" award.)	2021 American Athletic Conference softball tournament	Collins Family Softball Complex • Tulsa, OK	Wichita State
ASUN Conference	North & overall: Liberty; South: Florida Gulf Coast	Amber Bishop-Riley, Liberty	Emily Kirby, Liberty	Dot Richardson, Liberty	2021 ASUN softball tournament	Quarterfinals: Campus sites Remainder: Bailey Park • Kennesaw, GA	Liberty
Atlantic 10 Conference	Central & overall: George Washington; North: Saint Joseph's	Jenna Cone, George Washington	Sierra Lange, George Washington	Shane Winkler, George Washington	2021 Atlantic 10 Conference softball tournament	SJU Softball Field • Merion Station, PA	George Washington
Atlantic Coast Conference	Clemson	Valerie Cagle, Clemson	Keely Rochard, Virginia Tech	John Rittman, Clemson	2021 Atlantic Coast Conference softball tournament	Ulmer Stadium • Louisville, KY	Duke
Big 12 Conference	Oklahoma	Jocelyn Alo, Oklahoma	Carrie Eberle, Oklahoma State	Patty Gasso, Oklahoma	2021 Big 12 Conference softball tournament	USA Softball Hall of Fame Stadium • Oklahoma City, OK	Oklahoma
Big East Conference	DePaul				2021 Big East Conference softball tournament	Burrill Family Field • Storrs, CT	Villanova
Big Sky Conference	Weber State	Lauren Hoe, Weber State	Mariah Ramirez, Weber State	Mary Kay Amicone, Weber State	2021 Big Sky Conference softball tournament	Wildcat Softball Field • Ogden, UT	Portland State
Big South Conference	Campbell				2021 Big South Conference softball tournament	Brinkley Stadium • Boiling Springs, NC	Campbell
Big Ten Conference	Michigan	Lexie Blair, Michigan	Alex Storako, Michigan	Carol Hutchins, Michigan	No tournament, regular season champion earns auto bid		
Big West Conference	Long Beach State				No tournament, regular season champion earns auto bid		
Colonial Athletic Association	North: Drexel; South & overall: James Madison	Linda Rush, Drexel	Odicci Alexander, James Madison	Loren LaPorte, James Madison	2021 Colonial Athletic Association softball tournament	Eagle Field at Veterans Memorial Park • Harrisonburg, VA	James Madison
Conference USA	Charlotte				2021 Conference USA softball tournament	WKU Softball Complex • Bowling Green, KY	Western Kentucky
Horizon League	Youngstown State				2021 Horizon League softball tournament	YSU Softball Field • Youngstown, OH	UIC
Ivy League	Did not play in 2021						
Metro Atlantic Athletic Conference	Monmouth				2021 Metro Atlantic Athletic Conference softball tournament	Quarterfinals: Campus sites Remainder: Demske Sports Complex • Buffalo, NY	Manhattan
Mid-American Conference	Miami (OH)				No tournament, regular season champion earns auto bid		
Mid-Eastern Athletic Conference	Northern & overall: Morgan State; Southern: North Carolina A&T				2021 Mid-Eastern Athletic Conference softball tournament	NSU Softball Field • Norfolk, VA	Morgan State
Missouri Valley Conference	Illinois State				2021 Missouri Valley Conference softball tournament	Cooper Stadium • Evansville, IN	Southern Illinois
Mountain West Conference	Fresno State				No tournament, regular season champion earns auto bid		
Northeast Conference	Saint Francis (PA)				2021 Northeast Conference softball tournament	SFU Softball Field • Loretto, PA	Saint Francis (PA)
Ohio Valley Conference	Southeast Missouri				2021 Ohio Valley Conference softball tournament	Choccolocco Park • Oxford, AL	Eastern Kentucky
Pac–12 Conference	UCLA				No tournament, regular season champion earns auto bid		
Patriot League	Boston University				2021 Patriot League softball tournament	BU Softball Field • Boston, MA	Boston University
Southeastern Conference	Arkansas & Florida (Note: Top seed in conference tournament.)	Bailey Hemphill, Alabama	Montana Fouts, Alabama & Mary Haff, Arkansas	Courtney Deifel, Arkansas	2021 Southeastern Conference softball tournament	Rhoads Stadium • Tuscaloosa, AL	Alabama
Southern Conference	UNC Greensboro				2021 Southern Conference softball tournament	UNCG Softball Stadium • Greensboro, NC	UNC Greensboro
Southland Conference	Stephen F. Austin				2021 Southland Conference softball tournament	North Oak Park • Hammond, LA	McNeese State
Southwestern Athletic Conference	Eastern: Jackson State; Western & overall: Texas Southern				2021 Southwestern Athletic Conference softball tournament	Gulfport Sportsplex • Gulfport, MS	Alabama State
Summit League	South Dakota State				2021 Summit League softball tournament	Tharaldson Park at the Ellig Sports Complex • Fargo, ND	South Dakota State
Sun Belt Conference	Louisiana				2021 Sun Belt Conference softball tournament	Troy Softball Complex • Troy, AL	Louisiana
West Coast Conference	BYU				No tournament, regular season champion earns auto bid		
Western Athletic Conference	New Mexico State				2021 Western Athletic Conference softball tournament	Francis F. Logan Field at SU Park • Seattle, WA	Seattle

== Women's College World Series ==
First round
1	Oklahoma	3
James Madison	4^{(8)}
5	Oklahoma State	3
Georgia	2
1	Oklahoma	8^{(6)}
Georgia	0
3	Alabama	5
11	Arizona	1
10	Florida State	0
2	UCLA	4
11	Arizona	3
10	Florida State	4

Second round
James Madison	2
5	Oklahoma State	1
2	UCLA	3
1	Oklahoma	10
3	Alabama	6
2	UCLA	0
5	Oklahoma State	2
10	Florida State	4

Semifinals
James Madison	3	1
1	Oklahoma	6	7
3	Alabama	0	5
10	Florida State	2	8

Finals
1	Oklahoma	4	6	5
10	Florida State	8	2	1

== Season leaders ==
Batting:

- Batting average: .495 – Kayla Kowalik, Kentucky Wildcats
- RBIs: 92 – Tiare Jennings, Oklahoma Sooners
- Home runs: 34 – Jocelyn Alo, Oklahoma

Pitching:

- Wins: 32-5 – Gabbie Plain, Washington Huskies
- ERA: 0.92 (20 ER/151.0 IP) – Courtney Coppersmith, UMBC Retrievers
- Strikeouts: 349 – Montana Fouts, Alabama Crimson Tide

== Records ==
Freshman class RBIs: 92 – Tiare Jennings, Oklahoma Sooners

Freshman class slugging percentage: 1.000% – Tiare Jennings, Oklahoma Sooners

Team home runs: 161 – Oklahoma Sooners

Team slugging percentage: .777% – Oklahoma Sooners

Team runs scored: 638 – Oklahoma Sooners

Team total bases: 1,279 – Oklahoma Sooners

== Awards ==
- USA Softball Collegiate Player of the Year: Jocelyn Alo, Oklahoma Sooners
- Softball America Player of the Year: Jocelyn Alo, Oklahoma Sooners

YEAR	G	AB	R	H	BA	RBI	HR	3B	2B	TB	SLG	BB	SO	SB	SBA
2021	60	183	71	87	.475	89	34	1	12	203	1.109%	38	16	3	3

- Collegiate Woman Athlete of the Year Honda Sports Award Softball: Rachel Garcia, UCLA Bruins
- Honda Sports Award Softball: Rachel Garcia, UCLA Bruins
- NFCA National Player of the Year: Rachel Garcia, UCLA Bruins

YEAR	G	AB	R	H	BA	RBI	HR	3B	2B	TB	SLG	BB	SO	SB	SBA
2021	45	120	23	41	.341	35	13	0	5	85	.708%	30	20	0	0

YEAR	W	L	GP	GS	CG	SHO	SV	IP	H	R	ER	BB	SO	ERA	WHIP
2021	18	3	29	18	12	7	2	136.1	91	35	27	29	183	1.39	0.88

- NFCA National Pitcher of the Year: Montana Fouts, Alabama Crimson Tide

YEAR	W	L	GP	GS	CG	SHO	SV	IP	H	R	ER	BB	SO	ERA	WHIP
2021	27	4	36	32	24	10	3	213.1	143	59	49	49	349	1.61	0.90

- Softball America Pitcher of the Year: Odicci Alexander, James Madion Dukes

YEAR	W	L	GP	GS	CG	SHO	SV	IP	H	R	ER	BB	SO	ERA	WHIP
2021	18	3	23	22	16	6	1	143.2	80	46	35	45	204	1.71	0.87

YEAR	G	AB	R	H	BA	RBI	HR	3B	2B	TB	SLG	BB	SO	SB	SBA
2021	29	82	13	26	.317	12	2	0	4	36	.439%	17	11	0	0

- NFCA National Freshman of the Year: Tiare Jennings, Oklahoma Sooners
- Softball America Freshman of the Year: Tiare Jennings, Oklahoma Sooners

YEAR	G	AB	R	H	BA	RBI	HR	3B	2B	TB	SLG	BB	SO	SB	SBA
2021	60	197	81	91	.462	92	27	0	25	197	1.000%	26	17	2	2

- Softball America Defensive Player of the Year: Sis Bates, Washington
- NFCA Catcher of the Year: Dejah Mulipola, Arizona
- NFCA Golden Shoe Award: Jenna Wildeman, Central Arkansas

== All America Teams ==
The following players were members of the All-American Teams.

First Team

Position	Player	Class	School
P	Megan Faraimo	SO.	UCLA Bruins
P	Montana Fouts	JR.	Alabama Crimson Tide
P	Keely Rochard	JR.	Virginia Tech Hokies
C	Dejah Mulipola	SR.	Arizona Wildcats
1B	Alysen Febrey	SR.	Oklahoma State Cowgirls
2B	Tiare Jennings	FR.	Oklahoma Sooners
3B	Charla Echols	JR.	Florida Gators
SS	Sami Williams	SR.	Iowa State Cyclones
OF	Jocelyn Alo	SR.	Oklahoma Sooners
OF	Jayda Coleman	FR.	Oklahoma Sooners
OF	Maya Brady	FR.	UCLA Bruins
UT	Rachel Garcia	SR.	UCLA Bruins
UT	Aaliyah Jordan	SR.	UCLA Bruins
AT-L	Bailey Hemphill	SR.	Alabama Crimson Tide
AT-L	Mary Haff	JR.	Arkansas Razorbacks
AT-L	Braxton Burnside	SR.	Arkansas Razorbacks
AT-L	Gabbie Plain	SR.	Washington Huskies
AT-L	Kayla Kowalik	JR.	Kentucky Wildcats

Second Team

Position	Player	Class	School
P	Ashley Rogers	JR.	Tennessee Lady Vols
P	Carrie Eberle	SR.	Oklahoma State Cowgirls
P	Kathryn Sandercock	FR.	FSU Seminoles
C	Kinzie Hansen	SO.	Oklahoma Sooners
1B	Danielle Gibson	JR.	Arkansas Razorbacks
2B	Baylee Klingler	JR.	Washington Huskies
3B	Jenna Cone	SR.	George Washington Colonials
SS	Grace Lyons	JR.	Oklahoma Sooners
OF	Aliyah Andrews	SR.	LSU Tigers
OF	Kiki Milloy	SO.	Tennessee Lady Vols
OF	Abby Sweet	SR.	Notre Dame Fighting Irish
UT	Valerie Cagle	FR.	Clemson Tigers
UT	Deja Davis	JR.	Duke Blue Devils
AT-L	Odicci Alexander	SR.	James Madison Dukes
AT-L	Sis Bates	SR.	Washington Huskies
AT-L	Alex Storako	SO.	Michigan Wolverines
AT-L	Taylor Pleasants	FR.	LSU Tigers
AT-L	Maddi Hackbarth	SR.	Arizona State Sun Devils

Third Team

Position	Player	Class	School
P	Brooke Yanez	JR.	Oregon Ducks
P	Elizabeth Hightower	JR.	Florida Gators
P	Alyssa Denham	SR.	Arizona Wildcats
C	Haley Lee	JR.	Texas A&M Aggies
1B	Kaylee Tow	SR.	Alabama Crimson Tide
2B	Hannah Adams	SR.	Florida Gators
3B	Hannah Becerra	FR.	Cal State Fullerton Titans
SS	Briana Perez	JR.	UCLA Bruins
OF	Brooke Wilmes	JR.	Missouri Tigers
OF	Haley Cruse	SR.	Oregon Ducks
OF	Janelle Meono	FR.	Arizona Wildcats
UT	Paige Rauch	JR.	Villanova Wildcats
UT	Hayley Busby	SR.	Oklahoma State Cowgirls
AT-L	Georgina Corrick	JR.	USF Bulls
AT-L	Mackenzie Boesel	SR.	South Carolina Gamecocks
AT-L	Jessie Harper	SR.	Arizona Wildcats
AT-L	Sydney McKinney	SO.	Wichita State Shockers
AT-L	Janae Jefferson	JR.	Texas Longhorns

== See also ==
- 2021 NCAA Division I baseball season
