= 2021 Ole Miss Rebels softball team =

American college softball season

2021 Ole Miss Rebels softball

Tucson Regional, 2–2
- Conference: Southeastern Conference
- Record: 36–22 (12–12 SEC)
- Head coach: Jamie Trachsel (1st season)
- Assistant coaches: Katie Rietkovich Browder; Ryker Chason
- Home stadium: Ole Miss Softball Complex

2021 Southeastern Conference softball standings
	Conf.				Overall
Team	W		L	PCT	W		L	PCT
No. 9 Florida ‍†‍‍^{y}	19	–	5	.792	45	–	11	.804
No. 11 Arkansas ‍†‍‍^{y}	19	–	5	.792	43	–	11	.796
No. 3 Alabama ‍‍‡‍^{y}	18	–	6	.750	52	–	9	.852
No. 13 Missouri ‍‍‍^{y}	15	–	9	.625	42	–	17	.712
No. 16 Kentucky ‍‍‍^{y}	13	–	11	.542	43	–	16	.729
No. 15 LSU ‍‍‍^{y}	13	–	11	.542	35	–	22	.614
No. 22 Tennessee ‍‍‍^{y}	12	–	11	.522	42	–	15	.737
Ole Miss ‍‍‍^{y}	12	–	12	.500	36	–	22	.621
Mississippi State ‍‍‍^{y}	8	–	15	.348	35	–	25	.583
Texas A&M ‍‍‍^{y}	8	–	16	.333	32	–	23	.582
No. 8 Georgia ‍‍‍^{y}	7	–	17	.292	34	–	23	.596
Auburn ‍‍‍^{y}	7	–	17	.292	27	–	24	.529
South Carolina ‍‍‍	4	–	20	.167	26	–	26	.500
† – Conference champion ‡ – Tournament champion y – Invited to the NCAA tournament As of June 7, 2021; Rankings from NFCA/USA Today

The 2021 Ole Miss Rebels softball team represented the University of Mississippi in the 2021 NCAA Division I softball season. The Rebels played their home games at the Ole Miss Softball Complex.

== Previous season ==
The Rebels finished the 2020 season 12–13 overall, and 0–3 in the SEC. The season was cut short due to the COVID-19 pandemic. Following the season, interim head coach Ruben Felix was not retained. He took over for former head coach, Mike Smith, who resigned in December 2019. Minnesota head coach Jamie Trachsel was hired on April 24, 2020.

== Schedule and results ==
2021 Ole Miss Rebels Softball Game Log
Regular season

February
Date	Opponent	Rank	Site/stadium	Score	Win	Loss	Save	TV	Attendance	Overall record	SEC record
Trojan Classic
February 12	vs. UAB		Troy Softball Complex; Troy, AL	**W** 8–2	**Savannah Diederich (1–0)**	Amy Woodham (0–1)				1–0	
February 12	at Troy		Troy Softball Complex	**L** 2–5	Leanna Johnson (1–0)	**Ava Tillmann (0–1)**				1–1	
February 13	vs. Belmont		Troy Softball Complex	**W** 10–2^{(6)}	**Savannah Diederich (2–0)**	Alicia Veltri (0–1)				2–1	
February 13	vs. UAB		Troy Softball Complex	**L** 5–13^{(5)}	Emily Kachel (1–1)	**Savannah Diederich (2–1)**				2–2	
FAU "Strikeout Cancer" Tournament
February 19	vs. Iowa State		FAU Softball Stadium; Boca Raton, FL	**L** 0–2	Karlie Charles (2–0)	**Savannah Diederich (2–2)**			52	2–3	
February 19	at Florida Atlantic		FAU Softball Stadium	**W** 10–1^{(5)}	**Anna Borgen (1–0)**	Lynn Gardner (1–2)				3–3	
February 20	vs. No. 21 Missouri		FAU Softball Stadium	**L** 2–6	Laurin Krings (1–0)	**Savannah Diederich (2–3)**	Sophie Dandola (1)			3–4	
February 20	at Florida Atlantic		FAU Softball Stadium	**W** 11–0^{(5)}	**Ava Tillmann (1–1)**	Abigail Morgan (0–1)			115	4–4	
February 21	vs. Iowa State		FAU Softball Stadium	**L** 6–7	Karlie Charles (3–0)	**Aynslie Furbush (0–1)**			68	4–5	
Lone Star State Invitational
February 26	vs. UConn		Getterman Stadium; Waco, TX	**W** 7–0	**Landyn Bruce (1–0)**	Payton Kinney (2–2)		FloSports		5–5	
February 26	at No. 23 Baylor		Getterman Stadium	**W** 10–4	**Savannah Diederich (3–3)**	Aliyah Binford (1–1)		ESPN+	300	6–5	
February 27	vs. Sam Houston State		Bobcat Softball Stadium; San Marcos, TX	**W** 12–0^{(5)}	**Ava Tillmann (2–1)**	Mika Vento (2–1)				7–5	
February 27	at Texas State		Bobcat Softball Stadium	**L** 1–2	Jessica Mullins (2–2)	**Savannah Diederich (3–4)**				7–6	
February 28	at No. 7 Texas		Red & Charline McCombs Field; Austin, TX	**L** 2–5	Molly Jacobsen (3–0)	**Savannah Diederich (3–5)**		Longhorn Network		7–7	

March
Date	Opponent	Rank	Site/stadium	Score	Win	Loss	Save	TV	Attendance	Overall record	SEC record
March 3	North Alabama		Ole Miss Softball Complex	**W** 3–0	**Anna Borgen (2–0)**	Megan Garst (4–2)		SECN+	250	8–7	
Ole Miss Classic
March 5	Samford		Ole Miss Softball Complex	**W** 3–0	**Savannah Diederich (4–4)**	Emily Barnett (4–2)		SECN+	206	9–7	
March 5	Samford		Ole Miss Softball Complex	**W** 8–0^{(5)}	**Ava Tillmann (3–1)**	Abby Swaney (2–2)		SECN+	257	10–7	
March 6	North Dakota State		Ole Miss Softball Complex	**W** 8–0^{(6)}	**Anna Borgen (3–0)**	Paige Vargas (0–3)		SECN+	231	11–7	
March 6	North Dakota State		Ole Miss Softball Complex	**W** 3–1	**Landyn Bruce (2–0)**	Lainey Lyle (1–2)	**Ava Tillmann (1)**	SECN+	231	12–7	
March 7	Indiana State		Ole Miss Softball Complex	**W** 3–0	**Savannah Diederich (5–4)**	Abbey Kruzel (1–3)		SECN+	250	13–7	
March 7	Indiana State		Ole Miss Softball Complex	**W** 3–0	**Anna Borgen (4–0)**	Lexi Benko (0–2)		SECN+	325	14–7	
March 10	South Alabama		Ole Miss Softball Complex	**W** 6–5^{(8)}	**Anna Borgen (5–0)**	Kaitlyn Hughes (0–1)		SECN+	178	15–7	
March 13	Mississippi State		Ole Miss Softball Complex	**W** 6–0	**Anna Borgen (6–0)**	Emily Williams (3–1)		SECN	437	16–7	1–0
March 14	Mississippi State		Ole Miss Softball Complex	**W** 4–1	**Ava Tillmann (4–1)**	Aspen Wesley (2–3)	**Anna Borgen (1)**	SECN	658	17–7	2–0
March 15	Mississippi State		Ole Miss Softball Complex	**W** 8–0^{(5)}	**Savannah Diederich (6–4)**	Emily Williams (3–2)	**Anna Borgen (2)**	SECN	541	18–7	3–0
March 19	at No. 17 Arkansas		Bogle Park; Fayetteville, AR	**L** 1–5	Mary Haff (13–2)	**Anna Borgen (6–1)**			691	18–8	3–1
March 20	at No. 17 Arkansas		Bogle Park	**L** 2–3^{(8)}	Mary Haff (14–2)	**Savannah Diederich (6–6)**			704	18–9	3–2
March 21	at No. 17 Arkansas		Bogle Park	**L** 2–3^{(8)}	Autumn Storms (3–0)	**Anna Borgen (6–2)**		SECN+	694	18–10	3–3
March 24	Southern Miss		Ole Miss Softball Complex	**W** 4–1	**Savannah Diederich (7–6)**	Morgan Leinstock (5–3)	**Anna Borgen (3)**	SECN+	154	19–10	
March 26	No. 17 Georgia		Ole Miss Softball Complex	**W** 6–4	**Savannah Diederich (8–6)**	Mary Wilson Avant (11–2)		SECN+	407	20–10	4–3
March 27	No. 17 Georgia		Ole Miss Softball Complex	**L** 1–3	Alley Cutting (4–1)	**Anna Borgen (6–3)**		SECN+	341	20–11	4–4
March 28	No. 17 Georgia		Ole Miss Softball Complex	**W** 3–2	**Anna Borgen (7–3)**	Britton Rogers (0–1)		SECN+	481	21–11	5–4

April
Date	Opponent	Rank	Site/stadium	Score	Win	Loss	Save	TV	Attendance	Overall record	SEC record
April 1	at No. 15 LSU		Tiger Park; Baton Rouge, LA	**L** 0–1^{(8)}	Shelbi Sunseri (6–3)	**Anna Borgen (7–4)**		SECN+	685	21–12	5–5
April 2	at No. 15 LSU		Tiger Park	**L** 2–3	Ali Kilponen (5–3)	**Savannah Diederich (8–7)**		SECN+	952	21–13	5–6
April 3	at No. 15 LSU		Tiger Park	**W** 9–4^{(8)}	**Savannah Diederich (9–7)**	Shelbi Sunseri (6–4)		SECN+	930	22–13	6–6
April 6	Central Arkansas		Ole Miss Softball Complex	**W** 4–1	**Anna Borgen (8–4)**	Kayla Beaver (11–4)	**Savannah Diederich (1)**	SECN+	201	23–13	
April 9	South Carolina		Ole Miss Softball Complex	**W** 8–0^{(5)}	**Savannah Diederich (10–7)**	Leah Powell (5–2)		SECN+	223	24–13	7–6
April 10	South Carolina		Ole Miss Softball Complex	**W** 8–5	**Ava Tillmann (5–1)**	Rachel Vaughan (2–1)		SECN	361	25–13	8–6
April 11	South Carolina		Ole Miss Softball Complex	**L** 1–10^{(5)}	Cayla Drotar (2–4)	**Savannah Diederich (10–8)**		SECN+	307	25–14	8–7
April 14	Memphis		Ole Miss Softball Complex	**W** 11–0^{(5)}	**Landyn Bruce (3–0)**	Mariah Nichols (1–8)		SECN+	210	26–14	
April 16	at Texas A&M		Davis Diamond; College Station, TX	**W** 2–1	**Anna Borgen (9–4)**	Makinzy Herzog (10–3)	**Savannah Diederich (2)**	SECN+	253	27–14	9–7
April 17	at Texas A&M		Davis Diamond	**W** 3–1	**Ava Tillmann (6–1)**	Kayla Poynter (8–4)	**Savannah Diederich (3)**	SECN+	491	28–14	10–7
April 18	at Texas A&M		Davis Diamond	**L** 3–4	Grace Uribe (7–3)	**Ava Tillmann (6–2)**	Makinzy Herzog (3)	SECN+	382	28–15	10–8
April 21	UT Martin		Ole Miss Softball Complex	**W** 8–0^{(6)}	**Ava Tillmann (7–2)**	Emily Brown (2–1)		SECN+	139	29–15	
April 23	Auburn		Ole Miss Softball Complex	**W** 1–0^{(8)}	**Anna Borgen (10–4)**	Shelby Lowe (12–5)		SECN	291	30–15	11–8
April 24	Auburn		Ole Miss Softball Complex	**W** 6–1	**Savannah Diederich (11–8)**	Maddie Penta (8–7)		SECN	513	31–15	12–8
April 25	Auburn		Ole Miss Softball Complex	L' 1–3	Shelby Lowe (13–5)	**Ava Tillmann (7–3)**		SECN+	550	31–16	12–9
April 30	No. 25 UCF		Ole Miss Softball Complex	**W** 8–2	**Anna Borgen (11–4)**	Breanna Vasquez (4–3)		SECN+	239	32–16	

May
Date	Opponent	Rank	Site/stadium	Score	Win	Loss	Save	TV	Attendance	Overall record	SEC record
May 1	No. 25 UCF		Ole Miss Softball Complex	**W** 5–4^{(10)}	**Ava Tillmann (8–3)**	Alea White (17–5)		SECN+	293	33–16	
May 1	No. 25 UCF		Ole Miss Softball Complex	**W** 10–0^{(5)}	**Savannah Diederich (12–8)**	Gianna Mancha (12–5)		SECN+	431	34–16	
May 6	at No. 3 Alabama		Rhoads Stadium; Tuscaloosa, AL	**L** 0–8^{(5)}	Montana Fouts (18–3)	**Ava Tillmann (8–4)**		SECN+	1,419	34–17	12–10
May 7	at No. 3 Alabama		Rhoads Stadium	**L** 7–11	Krystal Goodman (8–1)	**Anna Borgen (11–5)**		SECN+	1,631	34–18	12–11
May 8	at No. 3 Alabama		Rhoads Stadium	**L** 1–6	Montana Fouts (19–3)	**Anna Borgen (11–6)**		SECN	1,631	34–19	12–12

Postseason

SEC Tournament
Date	Opponent	Seed	Site/stadium	Score	Win	Loss	Save	TV	Attendance	Overall record	SECT Record
May 12	vs. (9) Mississippi State	(8)	Rhoads Stadium; Tuscaloosa, AL	**L** 1–3	Emily Williams (8–5)	**Anna Borgen (11–7)**	Alyssa Loza (5)	SECN		34–20	0–1

NCAA tournament – Tucson Regional
Date	Opponent	Seed	Site/stadium	Score	Win	Loss	Save	TV	Attendance	Overall record	NCAAT record
May 21	vs. (3) Villanova	(2)	Rita Hillenbrand Memorial Stadium; Tucson, AZ	**W** 5–1	**Anna Borgen (12–7)**	Paige Rauch (20–4)		ESPNU	35–20	1–0	
May 22	at (1) No. 11 Arizona	(2)	Rita Hillenbrand Memorial Stadium	**L** 6–12	Mariah Lopez (8–2)	**Savannah Diederich (12–9)**	Hanah Bowen (2)	SECN		35–21	1–1
May 22	vs. (3) Villanova	(2)	Rita Hillenbrand Memorial Stadium	**W** 6–2	**Ava Tillmann (9–4)**	Sara Kennedy (6–5)		ESPN3	36–21	2–1	
May 23	at (1) No. 11 Arizona	(2)	Rita Hillenbrand Memorial Stadium	**L** 6–12	Mariah Lopez (9–2)	**Anna Borgen (12–8)**		ESPN3		36–22	2–2

Legend: = Win = Loss = Canceled
Bold = Ole Miss team member
Rankings are based on the team's current ranking in the NFCA poll.

== Tucson Regional ==
Tucson Regional Teams
(1) Arizona Wildcats	(2) Ole Miss Rebels	(3) Villanova Wildcats	(4) UMBC Retrievers

First Round
1	Arizona	7
4	UMBC	0
3	Villanova	1
2	Ole Miss	5
Lower round 1
4	UMBC	3
3	Villanova	4

Semifinals
1	Arizona	12
2	Ole Miss	6
Lower final
2	Ole Miss	6
3	Villanova	2

Finals
1	Arizona	12
2	Ole Miss	6

== Record vs. conference opponents ==
Date m/dd is for last scheduled game of series. Blank are not scheduled. Blue are home games, otherwise away.

2021 SEC softball records Source: 2021 SEC softball game results, 2021 SEC softball schedule
Team	W–L	ALA	ARK	AUB	FLA	UGA	KEN	LSU	MSU	MIZZ	MISS	SCAR	TENN	TAMU	Team	SR	SW
ALA	18–6		2–1	3–0	1–2	3–0	1–2	.	.	.	3–0	.	2–1	3–0	ALA	6–2	4–0
ARK	19–5	1–2		3–0	.	3–0	.	2–1	3–0	1–2	3–0	3–0	.	.	ARK	6–2	5–0
AUB	7–17	0–3	0–3		.	.	2–1	1–2	.	1–2	1–2	.	0–3	2–1	AUB	2–6	0–3
FLA	19–5	2–1	.	.		2–1	2–1	3–0	3–0	2–1	.	2–1	.	3–0	FLA	8–0	3–0
UGA	7–17	0–3	0–3	.	1–2		2–1	.	0–3	2–1	1–2	.	1–2	.	UGA	2–6	0–3
KEN	13–11	2–1	.	1–2	1–2	1–2		1–2	.	.	.	3–0	1–2	3–0	KEN	3–5	2–0
LSU	13–11	.	1–2	2–1	0–3	.	2–1		.	2–1	2–1	.	2–1	2–1	LSU	6–2	0–1
MSU	8–15	.	0–3	.	0–3	3–0	.	.		0–3	0–3	2–1	2–0	1–2	MSU	3–5	1–4
MIZZ	15–9	.	2–1	2–1	1–2	1–2	.	1–2	3–0		.	3–0	2–1	.	MIZZ	5–3	2–0
MISS	12–12	0–3	0–3	2–1	.	2–1	.	1–2	3–0	.		2–1	.	2–1	MISS	5–3	1–2
SCAR	4–20	.	0–3	.	1–2	.	0–3	.	1–2	0–3	1–2		1–2	0–3	SCAR	0–8	0–4
TENN	12–11	1–2	.	3–0	.	2–1	2–1	1–2	0–2	1–2	.	2–1		.	TENN	4–4	1–0
TAMU	8–16	0–3	.	1–2	0–3	.	0–3	1–2	2–1	.	1–2	3–0	.		TAMU	2–6	1–3
Team	W–L	ALA	ARK	AUB	FLA	UGA	KEN	LSU	MSU	MIZZ	MISS	SCAR	TENN	TAMU	Team	SR	SW

Updated for entire regular season.Tiebrkrs: FLA>ARK ALA common. LSU>KEN hd–hd. UGA>AUB MIZZ common.

== See also ==
- 2021 Ole Miss Rebels baseball team
