= 2021 Florida State Seminoles softball team =

American college softball season

2021 Florida State Seminoles softball

NCAA Tallahassee Regional champion NCAA Baton Rouge Super Regional champion

Women's College World Series, runner-up
- Conference: Atlantic Coast Conference
- Record: 49–12–1 (26–5–1 ACC)
- Head coach: Lonni Alameda (13th season)
- Home stadium: JoAnne Graf Field at the Seminole Softball Complex

2021 Atlantic Coast Conference softball standings
	Conf.						Overall
Team	W		L		T	PCT	W		L		T	PCT
No. 18 Clemson ‍†‍‍^{y}	29	–	5	–	0	.853	44	–	8	–	0	.846
No. 2 Florida State ‍‍‍^{y}	26	–	5	–	1	.828	49	–	12	–	1	.798
No. 20 Duke ‍‍‡‍^{y}	26	–	10	–	0	.722	44	–	12	–	0	.786
No. 14 Virginia Tech ‍‍‍^{y}	23	–	11	–	0	.676	37	–	15	–	0	.712
Notre Dame ‍‍‍^{y}	20	–	10	–	0	.667	33	–	15	–	0	.688
Louisville ‍‍‍	15	–	21	–	1	.419	21	–	28	–	1	.430
NC State ‍‍‍	15	–	22	–	0	.405	26	–	25	–	0	.510
Syracuse ‍‍‍	12	–	20	–	0	.375	20	–	24	–	0	.455
Georgia Tech ‍‍‍	11	–	19	–	0	.367	20	–	26	–	0	.435
North Carolina ‍‍‍	10	–	19	–	0	.345	14	–	26	–	0	.350
Pittsburgh ‍‍‍	12	–	24	–	0	.333	17	–	29	–	0	.370
Virginia ‍‍‍	10	–	27	–	0	.270	15	–	33	–	0	.313
Boston College ‍‍‍	8	–	24	–	0	.250	13	–	32	–	0	.289
† – Conference champion ‡ – Tournament champion y – Invited to the NCAA tournament As of June 15, 2021; Rankings from NFCA/USA Today

The 2021 Florida State Seminoles softball team represented Florida State University in the 2021 NCAA Division I softball season. The Seminoles were coached by Lonni Alameda, who led her thirteenth season. The Seminoles finished with a record of 49–12–1.

The Seminoles were invited to the 2021 NCAA Division I Softball Tournament, where they swept the NCAA Tallahassee Regional and Baton Rouge Super Regional and then completed a run to the title game of the Women's College World Series where they fell to champion Oklahoma.

== Personnel ==
=== Roster ===
2021 Florida State Seminoles roster
Pitchers: 12 - Caylan Arnold - (redshirt) Senior; 17 - Emma Wilson - (redshirt) Freshman; 21 - Jeya Prasad - Freshman; 22 - Brianna Enter - (redshirt) Freshman; 31 - Danielle Watson - (redshirt) Junior; 32 - Kathryn Sandercock - (redshirt) Sophomore; Catchers: 13 - Anna Shelnutt - (redshirt) Senior; 20 - Kaia Lopreste - (redshirt) Freshman; 51 - Michaela Edenfield - Freshman	Infielders: 9 - Devyn Flaherty - (redshirt) Freshman; 10 - Josie Muffley - (redshirt) Sophomore; 11 - Carson Saabye - Freshman; 24 - Sydney Sherrill - (redshirt) Junior; Outfielders: 1 - Dani Morgan - (redshirt) Senior; 2 - Maegan Tomlinson - (redshirt) Sophomore; 3 - Hallie Wacaser - Freshman; 4 - Jahni Kerr - Freshman; 6 - Kaley Mudge - (redshirt) Freshman; 7 - Kiersten Landers - (redshirt) Freshman; 26 - D’Aun Riggs - Freshman; 70 - Cassidy Davis - (redshirt) Senior	Utility: 5 - Elizabeth Mason - Senior; 8 - Kalei Harding - Freshman; 14 - Autumn Belviy - Freshman; 28 - Chloe Culp - (redshirt) Freshman

=== Coaches ===
2021 Florida State Seminoles softball coaching staff
- Lonni Alameda - Head coach - 13th season
- Travis Wilson - Assistant coach - 10th season
- Troy Cameron - Assistant coach - 1st season

== Schedule ==
Legend
	Florida State win
	Florida State loss
*	Non-Conference game

2021 Florida State Seminoles softball game log
Regular season

February
Date	Opponent	Rank	Site/stadium	Score	Overall record	ACC record
Feb 12	Memphis*	No. 12	JoAnne Graf Field at the Seminole Softball Complex • Tallahassee, FL	W 9–0^{5}	1–0	
Feb 12	No. 23 Missouri*	No. 12	JoAnne Graf Field at the Seminole Softball Complex • Tallahassee, FL	W 9–2	2–0	
Feb 13	Memphis*	No. 12	JoAnne Graf Field at the Seminole Softball Complex • Tallahassee, FL	W 3–2	3–0	
Feb 13	No. 23 Missouri*	No. 12	JoAnne Graf Field at the Seminole Softball Complex • Tallahassee, FL	L 5–9	3–1	
Feb 18	at Georgia Tech	No. 13	Shirley Clements Mewborn Field • Atlanta, GA	W 8–1	4–1	1–0
Feb 18	at Georgia Tech	No. 13	Shirley Clements Mewborn Field • Atlanta, GA	W 7–3	5–1	2–0
Feb 19	at Georgia Tech	No. 13	Shirley Clements Mewborn Field • Atlanta, GA	W 5–4	6–1	3–0
Feb 20	vs No. 14 Virginia Tech	No. 13	Shirley Clements Mewborn Field • Atlanta, GA	W 7–1	7–1	4–0
Feb 20	vs No. 14 Virginia Tech	No. 13	Shirley Clements Mewborn Field • Atlanta, GA	L 1–9^{5}	7–2	4–1
Feb 21	vs No. 14 Virginia Tech	No. 13	Shirley Clements Mewborn Field • Atlanta, GA	L 0–6	7–3	4–2
Feb 26	Florida Gulf Coast*	No. 15	JoAnne Graf Field at the Seminole Softball Complex • Tallahassee, FL	W 7–0	8–3	
Feb 27	Florida Gulf Coast*	No. 15	JoAnne Graf Field at the Seminole Softball Complex • Tallahassee, FL	W 4–1	9–3	
Feb 27	Southeastern Louisiana*	No. 15	JoAnne Graf Field at the Seminole Softball Complex • Tallahassee, FL	W 3–0	10–3	

March
Date	Opponent	Rank	Site/stadium	Score	Overall record	ACC record
Mar 5	at No. 5 Florida*	No. 16	Katie Seashole Pressly Softball Stadium • Gainesville, FL	L 0–5	10–4	
Mar 6	No. 5 Florida*	No. 16	JoAnne Graf Field at the Seminole Softball Complex • Tallahassee, FL	W 7–2	11–4	
Mar 11	No. 2 Arizona*	No. 15	JoAnne Graf Field at the Seminole Softball Complex • Tallahassee, FL	W 4–2	12–4	
Mar 12	No. 2 Arizona*	No. 15	JoAnne Graf Field at the Seminole Softball Complex • Tallahassee, FL	L 0–1	12–5	
Mar 13	No. 2 Arizona*	No. 15	JoAnne Graf Field at the Seminole Softball Complex • Tallahassee, FL	W 2–0	13–5	
Mar 20	vs Kennesaw State*	No. 13	Jane B. Moore Field • Auburn, AL	W 11–0^{5}	14–5	
Mar 20	at Auburn*	No. 13	Jane B. Moore Field • Auburn, AL	W 10–1^{5}	15–5	
Mar 21	vs Kennesaw State*	No. 13	Jane B. Moore Field • Auburn, AL	W 3–2	16–5	
Mar 21	at Auburn*	No. 13	Jane B. Moore Field • Auburn, AL	L 1–2	16–6	
Mar 26	at Boston College	No. 12	Boston College Softball Field • Boston, MA	W 3–2	17–6	5–2
Mar 26	at Boston College	No. 12	Boston College Softball Field • Boston, MA	W 5–0	18–6	6–2
Mar 27	at Boston College	No. 12	Boston College Softball Field • Boston, MA	W 4–1	19–6	7–2
Mar 27	at Boston College	No. 12	Boston College Softball Field • Boston, MA	W 10–2^{5}	20–6	8–2

April
Date	Opponent	Rank	Site/stadium	Score	Overall record	ACC record
Apr 2	Notre Dame	No. 10	JoAnne Graf Field at the Seminole Softball Complex • Tallahassee, FL	W 3–1	21–6	9–2
Apr 3	Notre Dame	No. 10	JoAnne Graf Field at the Seminole Softball Complex • Tallahassee, FL	W 8–0^{6}	22–6	10–2
Apr 3	Notre Dame	No. 10	JoAnne Graf Field at the Seminole Softball Complex • Tallahassee, FL	W 8–0^{5}	23–6	11–2
Apr 4	Notre Dame	No. 10	JoAnne Graf Field at the Seminole Softball Complex • Tallahassee, FL	W 5–0	24–6	12–2
Apr 9	Duke	No. 9	JoAnne Graf Field at the Seminole Softball Complex • Tallahassee, FL	W 5–0	25–6	13–2
Apr 10	Duke	No. 9	JoAnne Graf Field at the Seminole Softball Complex • Tallahassee, FL	W 3–0	26–6	14–2
Apr 11	Duke	No. 9	JoAnne Graf Field at the Seminole Softball Complex • Tallahassee, FL	W 4–3	27–6	15–2
Apr 17	at Syracuse	No. 9	Skytop Softball Stadium • Syracuse, NY	W 7–3	28–6	16–2
Apr 17	at Syracuse	No. 9	Skytop Softball Stadium • Syracuse, NY	W 9–0^{6}	29–6	17–2
Apr 18	at Syracuse	No. 9	Skytop Softball Stadium • Syracuse, NY	W 3–2^{8}	30–6	18–2
Apr 18	at Syracuse	No. 9	Skytop Softball Stadium • Syracuse, NY	W 13–1^{5}	31–6	19–2
Apr 23	at Louisville	No. 7	Ulmer Stadium • Louisville, KY	W 10–0	32–6	20–2
Apr 23	at Louisville	No. 7	Ulmer, KY • Louisville, KY	L 1–5	32–7	20–3
Apr 25	at Louisville	No. 7	Ulmer, KY • Louisville, KY	W 9–0^{5}	33–7	21–3
Apr 25	at Louisville	No. 7	Ulmer, KY • Louisville, KY	T0–0^{11}	33–7–1	21–3–1
Apr 30	NC State	No. 6	JoAnne Graf Field at the Seminole Softball Complex • Tallahassee, FL	W 2–1	34–7–1	22–3–1

May
Date	Opponent	Rank	Site/stadium	Score	Overall record	ACC record
May 1	NC State	No. 6	JoAnne Graf Field at the Seminole Softball Complex • Tallahassee, FL	W 6–1	35–7–1	23–3–1
May 1	NC State	No. 6	JoAnne Graf Field at the Seminole Softball Complex • Tallahassee, FL	L 2–5	35–8–1	23–4–1
May 2	NC State	No. 6	JoAnne Graf Field at the Seminole Softball Complex • Tallahassee, FL	W 4–1	36–8–1	24–4–1
May 7	at Pittsburgh	No. 6	Vartabedian Field • Pittsburgh, PA	L 5–6	36–9–1	24–5–1
May 8	at Pittsburgh	No. 6	Vartabedian Field • Pittsburgh, PA	W 5–4	37–9–1	25–5–1
May 9	at Pittsburgh	No. 6	Vartabedian Field • Pittsburgh, PA	W 14–0^{5}	38–9–1	26–5–1

Postseason

ACC Tournament
Date	Opponent	Rank/Seed	Site/stadium	Score	Overall record	ACCT record
May 13	(7) NC State	No. 7 (2)	Ulmer, KY • Louisville, KY	W 2–0	39–9–1	1–0
May 14	(3) Duke	No. 7 (2)	Ulmer, KY • Louisville, KY	L 3–4	39–10–1	1–1

NCAA Tallahassee Regional
Date	Opponent	Rank/Seed	Site/stadium	Score	Overall record	Reg record
May 21	Kennesaw State	No. 8 (10)	JoAnne Graf Field at the Seminole Softball Complex • Tallahassee, FL	W 6–2	40–10–1	1–0
May 22	UCF	No. 8 (10)	JoAnne Graf Field at the Seminole Softball Complex • Tallahassee, FL	W 3–0	41–10–1	2–0
May 23	UCF	No. 8 (10)	JoAnne Graf Field at the Seminole Softball Complex • Tallahassee, FL	W 2–0	42–10–1	3–0

NCAA Baton Rouge Super Regional
Date	Opponent	Rank/Seed	Site/stadium	Score	Overall record	SR record
May 27	at No. 16 (7) LSU	No. 8 (10)	Tiger Park • Baton Rouge, LA	W 1–0	43–10–1	1–0
May 28	at No. 16 (7) LSU	No. 8 (10)	Tiger Park • Baton Rouge, LA	W 4–3^{9}	44–10–1	2–0

NCAA Women's College World Series
Date	Opponent	Rank/Seed	Site/stadium	Score	Overall record	WCWS Record
June 3	No. 2 (2) UCLA	No. 8 (10)	ASA Hall of Fame Stadium • Oklahoma City, OK	L 0–4	44–11–1	0–1
June 5	No. 9 (11) Arizona	No. 8 (10)	ASA Hall of Fame Stadium • Oklahoma City, OK	W 4–3	45–11–1	1–1
June 5	No. 7 (5) Oklahoma State	No. 8 (10)	ASA Hall of Fame Stadium • Oklahoma City, OK	W 4–2	46–11–1	2–1
June 6	No. 3 (3) Alabama	No. 8 (10)	ASA Hall of Fame Stadium • Oklahoma City, OK	W 2–0	47–11–1	3–1
June 7	No. 3 (3) Alabama	No. 8 (10)	ASA Hall of Fame Stadium • Oklahoma City, OK	W 8–5	48–11–1	4–1
June 8	No. 1 (1) Oklahoma	No. 8 (10)	ASA Hall of Fame Stadium • Oklahoma City, OK	W 8–4	49–11–1	5–1
June 9	No. 1 (1) Oklahoma	No. 8 (10)	ASA Hall of Fame Stadium • Oklahoma City, OK	L 2–6	49–12–1	5–2
June 10	No. 1 (1) Oklahoma	No. 8 (10)	ASA Hall of Fame Stadium • Oklahoma City, OK	L 1–5	49–13–1	5–3

== Rankings ==
Ranking movements Legend: ██ Increase in ranking ██ Decrease in ranking
	Week																
Poll	Pre	1	2	3	4	5	6	7	8	9	10	11	12	13	14	15	Final
NFCA/USA Today	12	13	15	16	15	13	12	10	9	9	7	6	6	7	8	8*	2
ESPN.com/USA Softball Collegiate Top 25	12	14	15	16	16	13	13	10	10	9	7	6	9	8	9	9*	2
D1Softball	11	12	14	16	15	7	7	7	7	6	6	6	7	8	8	8*	2
Softball America	12	13	14	13	12	11	11	11	9	9	7	7	8	10	11	10	2
