= 2021 UCLA Bruins softball team =

American college softball season

2021 UCLA Bruins softball

NCAA Los Angeles Super Regional champion NCAA Los Angeles Regional champion Pac-12 champions

Women's College World Series, 1–2
- Conference: Pac-12 Conference
- Record: 47–7 (19–2 Pac-12)
- Head coach: Kelly Inouye-Perez (15th season)
- Home stadium: Easton Stadium

2021 Pac-12 Conference softball standings
	Conf.				Overall
Team	W		L	PCT	W		L	PCT
No. 2 UCLA ‍†‍‍^{y}	19	–	2	.905	47	–	7	.870
No. 6 Washington ‍‍‍^{y}	18	–	5	.783	45	–	14	.763
No. 10 Oregon ‍‍‍^{y}	14	–	10	.583	40	–	17	.702
No. 12 Arizona State ‍‍‍^{y}	12	–	9	.571	33	–	16	.673
No. 9 Arizona ‍‍‍^{y}	12	–	10	.545	41	–	15	.732
Stanford ‍‍‍^{y}	9	–	12	.429	33	–	22	.600
Oregon State ‍‍‍	7	–	17	.292	20	–	26	.435
California ‍‍‍	3	–	11	.214	17	–	20	.459
Utah ‍‍‍	3	–	21	.125	22	–	33	.400
† – Conference champion y – Invited to the NCAA tournament As of June 9, 2021; Rankings from NFCA

The 2021 UCLA Bruins softball team represented the University of California, Los Angeles in the 2021 NCAA Division I softball season. The Bruins were coached by Kelly Inouye-Perez, in her fifteenth season as head coach. The Bruins played their home games at Easton Stadium and finished with a record of 47–7. They competed in the Pac-12 Conference, where they finished first with a 19–2 record.

Opening the season as the preseason number 1 ranked team and with several key players returning, the Bruins had high expectations at the outset. The Bruins were invited to the 2021 NCAA Division I softball tournament, where they won the Los Angeles Regional and Super Regional to advance to the Women's College World Series. They finished tied for fifth place with a win against eventual runner-up Florida State and losses to semifinalist Alabama and champion Oklahoma.

== Personnel ==
=== Roster ===
2021 UCLA Bruins roster
Pitchers: 00 - Rachel Garcia - (redshirt) Senior; 4 - Holly Azevedo - (redshirt) Junior; 8 - Megan Faraimo - (redshirt) Sophomore; 12 - Lexi Sosa - (redshirt) Freshman; Catchers: 18 - Sara Rusconi Vicinanza - (redshirt) Freshman; 19 - Alyssa Garcia - (redshirt) Freshman; 25 - Taylor Sullivan - (redshirt) Sophomore; 43 - Jenavee Peres - (redshirt) Senior	Infielders: 3 - Briana Perez - (redshirt) Junior; 10 - Malia Quarles - Senior; 24 - Thessa Malau'ulu - Freshman; 37 - Kinsley Washington - (redshirt) Junior; 97 - Delanie Wisz - (redshirt) Junior; Outfielders: 5 - Julie Rodriguez - Senior; 13 - Carson Armijo - Freshman; 14 - Kelli Godin - (redshirt) Sophomore; 21 - Grace Guzman - Freshman; 23 - Aaliyah Jordan - (redshirt) Junior; 94 - Lauryn Carter - Freshman	Utility: 7 - Maya Brady - (redshirt) Freshman; 11 - Seneca Curo - (redshirt) Freshman; 20 - Anna Vines - (redshirt) Sophomore; 32 - Alana Snow - Senior; 33 - Taylor Edwards - (redshirt) Freshman; 48 - Bubba Nickles - (redshirt) Senior

=== Coaches ===
2021 UCLA Bruins softball coaching staff
- Kelly Inouye-Perez - Head coach - 15th season
- Lisa Fernandez - Assistant Coach - 23th season
- Kirk Walker - Assistant Coach - 20th season

== Schedule ==
Due to COVID-19 restrictions, the schedule was extensive and tentative. Seven conference series were scheduled, with four game sets planned instead of the usual three. Only the first game of the Saturday conference doubleheaders counted towards league standings.

Legend
	UCLA win
	UCLA loss
*	Non-Conference game

2021 UCLA Bruins softball game log
Regular season

February
Date	Opponent	Rank	Site/stadium	Score	Overall record	Pac-12 record
Feb 12	Fresno State*	No. 1	Easton Stadium • Los Angeles, CA	W 7–0	1–0	
Feb 20	at Cal State Fullerton*	No. 1	Anderson Family Field • Fullerton, CA	W 6–2	2–0	
Feb 20	at Cal State Fullerton*	No. 1	Anderson Family Field • Fullerton, CA	W 10–4	3–0	
Feb 21	Loyola Marymount*	No. 1	Easton Stadium • Los Angeles, CA	W 11–1 ^{(5)}	4–0	
Feb 21	Loyola Marymount*	No. 1	Easton Stadium • Los Angeles, CA	W 6–1	5–0	
Feb 24	San Diego State*	No. 1	Easton Stadium • Los Angeles, CA	W 14–0 ^{(5)}	6–0	
Feb 28	vs No. 8 Oregon*	No. 1	Alberta B. Farrington Softball Stadium • Tempe, AZ	L 1–3	6–1	

March
Date	Opponent	Rank	Site/stadium	Score	Overall record	Pac-12 record
Mar 1	vs No. 8 Oregon*	No. 1	Alberta B. Farrington Softball Stadium • Tempe, AZ	W 9–3	7–1	
Mar 1	vs Utah*	No. 1	Alberta B. Farrington Softball Stadium • Tempe, AZ	W 6–5	8–1	
Mar 3	Cal State Fullerton*	No. 4	Easton Stadium • Los Angeles, CA	W 9–1 ^{(5)}	9–1	
Mar 7	San Jose State*	No. 4	Easton Stadium • Los Angeles, CA	W 14–0 ^{5)}	10–1	
Mar 9	UC San Diego*	No. 3	Easton Stadium • Los Angeles, CA	W 7–1	11–1	
Mar 11	UC Santa Barbara*	No. 3	Easton Stadium • Los Angeles, CA	W 8–0 ^{(5)}	12–1	
Mar 11	UC Santa Barbara*	No. 3	Easton Stadium • Los Angeles, CA	W 8–0 ^{(5)}	13–1	
Mar 12	UNLV*	No. 3	Easton Stadium • Los Angeles, CA	W 10–0 ^{(5)}	14–1	
Mar 12	UNLV	No. 3	Easton Stadium • Los Angeles, CA	W 8–0 ^{(5)}	15–1	
Mar 19	No. 11 Arizona State	No. 2	Easton Stadium • Los Angeles, CA	W 2–1 ^{(8)}	16–1	1–0
Mar 20	No. 11 Arizona State	No. 2	Easton Stadium • Los Angeles, CA	W 6–1	17–1	2–0
Mar 20	No. 11 Arizona State*	No. 2	Easton Stadium • Los Angeles, CA	W 4–0	18–1	
Mar 21	No. 11 Arizona State	No. 2	Easton Stadium • Los Angeles, CA	W 9–0 ^{(5)}	19–1	3–0

April
Date	Opponent	Rank	Site/stadium	Score	Overall record	Pac-12 record
Apr 9	at No. 3 Oregon	No. 2	Jane Sanders Stadium • Eugene, OR	L 0–3	19–2	3–1
Apr 10	at No. 3 Oregon	No. 2	Jane Sanders Stadium • Eugene, OR	W 3–0	20–2	4–1
Apr 10	at No. 3 Oregon*	No. 2	Jane Sanders Stadium • Eugene, OR	W 9–3	21–2	
Apr 11	at No. 3 Oregon	No. 2	Jane Sanders Stadium • Eugene, OR	W 6–2	22–2	5–1
Apr 16	Oregon State	No. 2	Easton Stadium • Los Angeles, CA	W 7–0	23–2	6–1
Apr 17	Oregon State	No. 2	Easton Stadium • Los Angeles, CA	W 7–0	24–2	7–1
Apr 18	Oregon State	No. 2	Easton Stadium • Los Angeles, CA	W 6–0	25–2	8–1
Apr 23	No. 4 Washington	No. 2	Easton Stadium • Los Angeles, CA	W 6–1	26–2	9–1
Apr 24	No. 4 Washington	No. 2	Easton Stadium • Los Angeles, CA	L 4–7	26–3	9–2
Apr 24	No. 4 Washington*	No. 2	Easton Stadium • Los Angeles, CA	W 6–1	27–3	
Apr 25	No. 4 Washington	Easton Stadium • Los Angeles, CA	W 4–2	28–3	20–2	
Apr 30	at Utah	No. 2	Dumke Family Softball Stadium • Salt Lake City, UT	W 5–0	29–3	11–2

May
Date	Opponent	Rank	Site/stadium	Score	Overall record	Pac-12 record
May 1	at Utah	No. 2	Dumke Family Softball Stadium • Salt Lake City, UT	W 4–0	30–3	12–2
May 1	at Utah*	No. 2	Dumke Family Softball Stadium • Salt Lake City, UT	W 4–2	31–3	
May 2	at Utah	No. 2	Dumke Family Softball Stadium • Salt Lake City, UT	W 6–1	32–3	13–2
May 5	at Long Beach State*	No. 2	LBSU Softball Complex • Long Beach, CA	W 5–1	33–3	
May 5	at Long Beach State*	No. 2	LBSU Softball Complex • Long Beach, CA	W 10–2 ^{(5)}	34–3	
May 7	Stanford	No. 2	Easton Stadium • Los Angeles, CA	W 4–0	35–3	14–2
May 8	Stanford	No. 2	Easton Stadium • Los Angeles, CA	W 9–0 ^{(5)}	36–3	15–2
May 8	Stanford*	No. 2	Easton Stadium • Los Angeles, CA	W 3–1	37–3	
May 9	Stanford	No. 2	Easton Stadium • Los Angeles, CA	W 8–0 ^{(5)}	38–3	16–2
May 13	at No. 8 Arizona	No. 2	Rita Hillenbrand Memorial Stadium • Tucson, AZ	W 8–0 ^{(5)}	39–3	17–2
May 14	at No. 8 Arizona	No. 2	Rita Hillenbrand Memorial Stadium • Tucson, AZ	W 6–2	40–3	18–2
May 14	at No. 8 Arizona*	No. 2	Rita Hillenbrand Memorial Stadium • Tucson, AZ	L 1–5	40–4	
May 15	at No. 8 Arizona	No. 2	Rita Hillenbrand Memorial Stadium • Tucson, AZ	W 7–2	41–4	19–2

Postseason

NCAA Los Angeles Regional
Date	Opponent	Rank (Seed)	Site/stadium	Score	Overall record	Reg record
May 21	Long Beach State	No. 2 (2)	Easton Stadium • Los Angeles, CA	W 8–0 ^{(5)}	42–4	1–0
May 22	Fresno State	No. 2 (2)	Easton Stadium • Los Angeles, CA	W 5–4 ^{(8)}	43–4	2–0
May 23	Minnesota	No. 2 (2)	Easton Stadium • Los Angeles, CA	W 2–1	44–4	3–0

NCAA Los Angeles Super Regional
Date	Opponent	Rank (Seed)	Site/stadium	Score	Overall record	SR record
May 27	No. 21 Virginia Tech	No. 2 (2)	Easton Stadium • Los Angeles, CA	L 2–7	44–5	0–1
May 28	No. 21 Virginia Tech	No. 2 (2)	Easton Stadium • Los Angeles, CA	W 2–0	45–5	1–1
May 29	No. 21 Virginia Tech	No. 2 (2)	Easton Stadium • Los Angeles, CA	W 6–0	46–5	2–1

NCAA Women's College World Series
Date	Opponent	Rank (Seed)	Site/stadium	Score	Overall record	WCWS Record
June 3	No. 8 (10) Florida State	No. 2 (2)	USA Softball Hall of Fame Stadium • Oklahoma City, OK	W 4–0	47–5	1–0
June 4	No. 3 (3) Alabama	No. 2 (2)	USA Softball Hall of Fame Stadium • Oklahoma City, OK	L 0–6	47–6	1–1
June 5	No. 1 (1) Oklahoma	No. 2 (2)	USA Softball Hall of Fame Stadium • Oklahoma City, OK	L 3–10	47–7	1–2

== Ranking movements ==
Ranking movements Legend: ██ Increase in ranking ██ Decrease in ranking
	Week																
Poll	Pre	1	2	3	4	5	6	7	8	9	10	11	12	13	14	15	Final
NFCA/USA Today	1	1	1	4	3	2	2	2	2	2	2	2	2	2	2	2*	5
ESPN.com/USA Softball Collegiate Top 25	1	1	1	4	3	3	2	2	2	2	2	2	2	2	2	2*	5
D1Softball	1	1	1	2	2	2	2	2	2	2	2	2	2	2	2	2*	6
Softball America	1	1	1	2	2	2	2	2	2	2	2	2	2	2	2	2	6
