= 2021 Arkansas Razorbacks softball team =

American college softball season

2021 Arkansas Razorbacks softball

NCAA Fayetteville Regional champion SEC regular season co-champion

NCAA Fayetteville Super Regional SEC tournament second round
- Conference: Southeastern Conference

Ranking
- Coaches: No. 11
- Record: 43–11 (19–5 SEC)
- Head coach: Courtney Deifel (6th season)
- Assistant coaches: Matt Meuchel; Yolanda McRae
- Home stadium: Bogle Park

2021 Southeastern Conference softball standings
	Conf.				Overall
Team	W		L	PCT	W		L	PCT
No. 9 Florida ‍†‍‍^{y}	19	–	5	.792	45	–	11	.804
No. 11 Arkansas ‍†‍‍^{y}	19	–	5	.792	43	–	11	.796
No. 3 Alabama ‍‍‡‍^{y}	18	–	6	.750	52	–	9	.852
No. 13 Missouri ‍‍‍^{y}	15	–	9	.625	42	–	17	.712
No. 16 Kentucky ‍‍‍^{y}	13	–	11	.542	43	–	16	.729
No. 15 LSU ‍‍‍^{y}	13	–	11	.542	35	–	22	.614
No. 22 Tennessee ‍‍‍^{y}	12	–	11	.522	42	–	15	.737
Ole Miss ‍‍‍^{y}	12	–	12	.500	36	–	22	.621
Mississippi State ‍‍‍^{y}	8	–	15	.348	35	–	25	.583
Texas A&M ‍‍‍^{y}	8	–	16	.333	32	–	23	.582
No. 8 Georgia ‍‍‍^{y}	7	–	17	.292	34	–	23	.596
Auburn ‍‍‍^{y}	7	–	17	.292	27	–	24	.529
South Carolina ‍‍‍	4	–	20	.167	26	–	26	.500
† – Conference champion ‡ – Tournament champion y – Invited to the NCAA tournament As of June 7, 2021; Rankings from NFCA/USA Today

The 2021 Arkansas Razorbacks softball team represented the University of Arkansas in the 2021 NCAA Division I softball season. The Razorbacks were led by sixth-year head coach Courtney Deifel and played their home games at Bogle Park.

== Previous season ==
The Razorbacks had a record of 19–6 overall, and 1–2 in the SEC, when the 2020 season was cancelled due to the COVID-19 pandemic.

== Personnel ==
=== Roster ===
2021 Arkansas Razorbacks roster
Pitchers: 4 Mary Haff (RH) – RS Junior; 5 Lauren Howell (RH) – Freshman; 9 Autumn Storms (RH) – RS Senior; 72 Jenna Bloom (RH) – RS Freshman; Catchers: 12 Abby Gordon – Freshman; 13 Kayla Green – RS Junior	Infielders: 2 Valerie Ventura – RS Sophomore; 3 Larissa Cesena – RS Sophomore (OF); 16 Keely Huffine – RS Senior; 18 Marlene Friedman – Freshman; 24 Nicole Duncan – RS Junior (C); 25 Braxton Burnside – RS Senior; 41 Danielle Gibson – RS Junior; 66 Aly Manzo – RS Senior; 99 Audrie LaValley – RS Sophomore	Outfielders: 1 Ryan Jackson – RS Senior; 22 Linnie Malkin – RS Junior; 23 Hannah McEwen – RS Junior; 42 Sam Torres – RS Sophomore; Utility players: 00 Kaitlyn Howard – Freshman; 6 Cally Kildow – Freshman; 20 Hannah Gammill – Freshman; 21 Lauren Graves – RS Senior; 28 Rylin Hedgecock – RS Freshman; 31 Allie Light – Freshman

== Schedule and results ==
Legend
	Arkansas win
	Arkansas loss
	Postponement
**Bold**	Arkansas team member

2021 Arkansas Razorbacks softball game log
Regular season

February (11–2)
Date	Opponent	Rank	Site/stadium	Score	Win	Loss	Save	TV	Attendance	Overall record	SEC record
Best on the Bayou Classic
February 11	vs. No. 11 Oklahoma State*	No. 18	Ouachita Sportsplex; Monroe, Louisiana	**L** 11–12	K. Maxwell (1–0)	**M. Haff** (0–1)				0–1	
February 12	vs. Lipscomb*	No. 18	Ouachita Sportsplex	Cancelled due to inclement weather related to the February 13–17, 2021 North American winter storm.							
February 12	vs. Jacksonville State*	No. 18	Ouachita Sportsplex	Cancelled due to inclement weather related to the February 13–17, 2021 North American winter storm.							
February 13	vs. No. 11 Oklahoma State*	No. 18	Ouachita Sportsplex	Cancelled due to inclement weather related to the February 13–17, 2021 North American winter storm.							
February 13	at Louisiana–Monroe*	No. 18	Ouachita Sportsplex	Cancelled due to inclement weather related to the February 13–17, 2021 North American winter storm.							
Cowgirl Classic (Note: Arkansas added the Cowgirl Classic to their schedule after the initial cancellation of their Maverick Classic games, which were scheduled to be held February 22–23.)
February 20 (DH)	at McNeese State*	No. 20	Joe Miller Field at Cowgirl Diamond; Lake Charles, Louisiana	**W** 6–4 (14)	**M. Haff** (1–1)	A. Vallejo (0–2)				1–1	
February 20 (DH)	at McNeese State*	No. 20	Joe Miller Field at Cowgirl Diamond	**L** 4–7	S. Flores (2–0)	**J. Bloom** (0–1)				1–2	
February 21 (DH)	vs. No. 23 Baylor*	No. 20	Joe Miller Field at Cowgirl Diamond	**W** 7–2	**M. Haff** (2–1)	G. Rodoni (0–1)				2–2	
February 21 (DH)	at McNeese State*	No. 20	Joe Miller Field at Cowgirl Diamond	**W** 3–1	**M. Haff** (3–1)	S. Flores (2–1)				3–2	
Maverick Classic
February 22 (DH)	at UT Arlington*	No. 20	Allan Saxe Field	**W** 10–6	**L. Howell** (1–0)	K. Hines (0–1)				4–2	
February 22 (DH)	at UT Arlington*	No. 20	Allan Saxe Field	**W** 4–3	**J. Bloom** (1–1)	G. Bumpurs (1–1)	**M. Haff** (1)			5–2	
February 22	at Abilene Christian*	No. 20	Allan Saxe Field	Cancelled due to inclement weather. (Note: Arkansas originally had games scheduled against Abilene Christian, UT Arlington, and Wichita State, but all games were cancelled due to inclement weather. A doubleheader was later scheduled against UT Arlington on February 22, as part of the tournament.)							
February 23	at Wichita State*	No. 21	Allan Saxe Field	Cancelled due to inclement weather.							
Razorback Invitational
February 25 (DH)	North Dakota State*	No. 21	Bogle Park; Fayetteville, Arkansas	**W** 9–0 (5)	**A. Storms** (1–0)	P. Vargas (0–1)				6–2	
February 25 (DH)	North Dakota State*	No. 21	Bogle Park	**W** 5–0	**M. Haff** (4–1)	L. Lyle (0–1)				7–2	
February 26 (DH)	Texas Tech*	No. 21	Bogle Park	**W** 9–0 (5)	**M. Haff** (5–1)	E. Edmoundson (2–1)				8–2	
February 26 (DH)	Southeast Missouri State*	No. 21	Bogle Park	**W** 9–3	**J. Bloom** (2–1)	P. Holman (0–3)			570	9–2	
February 27	Southeast Missouri State*	No. 21	Bogle Park	**W** 6–3	**A. Storms** (2–0)	R. Rook (2–4)			574	10–2	
February 28	Texas Tech*	No. 21	Bogle Park	**W** 8–0	**M. Haff** (6–1)	M. Hornback (0–1)			555	11–2	

March (17–1)
Date	Opponent	Rank	Site/stadium	Score	Win	Loss	Save	TV	Attendance	Overall record	SEC record
Woo Pig Classic
March 4 (DH)	Drake*	No. 20	Bogle Park	**W** 6–3	**J. Bloom** (3–1)	N. Timmons (1–3)		SECN+	525	12–2	
March 4 (DH)	Drake*	No. 20	Bogle Park	**W** 6–4	**M. Haff** (7–1)	A. Timmons (1–4)		SECN+	528	13–2	
March 5 (DH)	Kansas*	No. 20	Bogle Park	**W** 8–3	**M. Haff** (8–1)	T. Goff (2–1)		SECN+	564	14–2	
March 5 (DH)	Northwestern State*	No. 20	Bogle Park	**W** 13–5 (6)	**L. Howell** (2–0)	B. Rhoden (1–1)		SECN+	578	15–2	
March 6	Northwestern State*	No. 20	Bogle Park	**W** 13–2 (5)	**M. Haff** (9–1)	J. Howell (3–3)			590	16–2	
March 9	at Central Arkansas*	No. 19	Farris Field; Conway, Arkansas	**W** 4–1	**M. Haff** (10–1)	J. Johnson (3–4)		Cox Sports Television/ESPN+	755	17–2	
March 12	at No. 20 South Carolina	No. 19	Beckham Field; Columbia, South Carolina	**W** 4–1	**M. Haff** (11–1)	K. Oh (1–3)		SECN+	400	18–2	1–0
March 13	at No. 20 South Carolina	No. 19	Beckham Field	**W** 7–5 (10)	**M. Haff** (12–1)	K. Ochs (2–2)		SECN+	400	19–2	2–0
March 14	at No. 20 South Carolina	No. 19	Beckham Field	**W** 3–2	**J. Bloom** (3–2)	K. Oh (1–4)	**M. Haff** (2)	SECN	400	20–2	3–0
March 16	Liberty*	No. 17	Bogle Park	**L** 0–2 (10)	E. Kirby (5–3)	**M. Haff** (12–2)		SECN+	582	20–3	
March 19	Ole Miss	No. 17	Bogle Park	**W** 5–1	**M. Haff** (13–2)	A. Borgen (6–1)			691	21–3	4–0
March 20	Ole Miss	No. 17	Bogle Park	**W** 3–2 (8)	**M. Haff** (14–2)	S. Diederich (6–6)			704	22–3	5–0
March 21	Ole Miss	No. 17	Bogle Park	**W** 3–2 (8)	**A. Storms** (3–0)	A. Borgen (6–2)		SECN+	694	23–3	6–0
March 23	at Kansas City*	No. 15	Urban Youth Academy Softball Complex; Kansas City, Missouri	**W** 9–3	**J. Bloom** (5–1)	M. Hoveland (7–5)			50	24–3	
March 24	at Kansas*	No. 15	Arrocha Ballpark at Rock Chalk Park; Lawrence, Kansas	**W** 7–4	**M. Haff** (15–2)	K. Hamiltonf (3–4)	**A. Storms** (1)	ESPN+	254	25–3	
March 26	Mississippi State	No. 15	Bogle Park	**W** 2–0	**M. Haff** (16–2)	A. Willis (6–3)	**A. Storms** (2)	SECN+	690	26–3	7–0
March 27	Mississippi State	No. 15	Bogle Park	**W** 8–7	**J. Bloom** (6–1)	A. Wesley (2–4)	**M. Haff** (3)	SECN+	704	27–3	8–0
March 28	Mississippi State	No. 15	Bogle Park	**W** 4–3	**M. Haff** (17–2)	A. Willis (7–4)		SECN+	701	28–3	9–0

April (10–4)
Date	Opponent	Rank	Site/stadium	Score	Win	Loss	Save	TV	Attendance	Overall record	SEC record
April 1	at Auburn	No. 13	Jane B. Moore Field; Auburn, Alabama	**W** 6–1	**M. Haff** (18–2)	M. Penta (6–4)		SECN	370	29–3	10–0
April 2	at Auburn	No. 13	Jane B. Moore Field	**W** 3–0	**A. Storms** (4–0)	S. Lowe (8–3)		SECN	370	30–3	11–0
April 3	at Auburn	No. 13	Jane B. Moore Field	**W** 2–0	**J. Bloom** (7–1)	M. Penta (6–5)	**A. Storms** (3)	SECN	370	31–3	12–0
April 6	Missouri State*	No. 10	Bogle Park	**W** 9–1 (5)	**A. Storms** (5–0)	M. Hunsaker (6–4)			621	32–3	
April 9	No. 4 Alabama	No. 10	Bogle Park	**L** 3–5	M. Fouts (12–2)	**M. Haff** (18–3)		SECN+	1,100	32–4	12–1
April 10	No. 4 Alabama	No. 10	Bogle Park	**W** 4–0	**A. Storms** (6–0)	L. Kilfoyl (11–3)		ESPN2	1,221	33–4	13–1
April 11	No. 4 Alabama	No. 10	Bogle Park	**L** 0–2	M. Fouts (13–2)	**A. Storms** (6–1)		SECN+	1,236	33–5	13–2
April 16	at No. 20 Georgia	No. 10	Jack Turner Stadium; Athens, Georgia	**W** 10–3	**A. Storms** (7–1)	M. Avant (14–5)	**M. Haff** (4)	SECN+	314	34–5	14–2
April 17	at No. 20 Georgia	No. 10	Jack Turner Stadium	**W** 5–2	**M. Haff** (19–3)	A. Cutting (6–3)		SECN+	387	35–5	15–2
April 18	at No. 20 Georgia	No. 10	Jack Turner Stadium	**W** 5–2	**J. Bloom** (8–1)	A. Cutting (6–4)	**M. Haff** (5)	SECN+	400	36–5	16–2
April 20	Central Arkansas	No. 8	Bogle Park	**W** 7–6 (8)	**M. Haff** (20–3)	J. Johnson (9–6)		SECN+	873	37–5	
April 24	No. 18 Missouri	No. 8	Bogle Park	**L** 3–6	J. Weber (9–2)	**M. Haff** (20–4)	E. Nichols (7)		1,340	37–6	16–3
April 25	No. 18 Missouri	No. 8	Bogle Park	**L** 1–10	L. Krings (7–2)	**J. Bloom** (8–2)		SECN	1,358	37–7	16–4
April 26	No. 18 Missouri	No. 8	Bogle Park	**W** 8–4	**M. Haff** (21–4)	J. Weber (9–3)	**A. Storms** (4)	SECN	1,154	38–7	17–4

May (2–1)
Date	Opponent	Rank	Site/stadium	Score	Win	Loss	Save	TV	Attendance	Overall record	SEC record
May 1	at No. 16 LSU	No. 10	Tiger Park; Baton Rouge, Louisiana	**W** 1–0	**M. Haff** (22–4)	S. Sunseri (7–6)		ESPNU	1,732	39–7	18–4
May 3 (DH)	at No. 16 LSU	No. 10	Tiger Park	**L** 1–2	A. Kilponen (13–6)	**M. Haff** (22–5)		SECN	2,246	39–8	18–5
May 3 (DH)	at No. 16 LSU	No. 10	Tiger Park	**W** 4–1	**M. Haff** (23–5)	M. Gorsuch (2–2)		SECN	2,246	40–8	19–5

Postseason

SEC Tournament (0–1)
Date	Opponent	Rank (Seed)	Site/stadium	Score	Win	Loss	Save	TV	Attendance	Overall record	SECT Record
May 13	No. 19 (7) Tennessee	No. 6 (2)	Rhoads Stadium; Tuscaloosa, Alabama	**L** 0–1	A. Rogers (25–8)	**M. Haff** (23–6)		SECN		40–9	0–1

NCAA Fayetteville Regional (3–0)
Date	Opponent	Rank (Seed)	Site/stadium	Score	Win	Loss	Save	TV	Attendance	Overall record	NCAAT record
May 21	(4) Manhattan	No. 5 (1)	Bogle Park	**W** 8–0 (5)	**M. Haff** (24–6)	N. Williams (13–3)		SECN	1,862	41–9	1–0
May 22	(3) South Dakota State	No. 5 (1)	Bogle Park	**W** 4–0	**M. Haff** (25–6)	G. Glanzer (19–5)		SECN	2,166	42–9	2–0
May 23	(2) Stanford	No. 5 (1)	Bogle Park	**W** 7–3	**M. Haff** (26–6)	A. Vawter (22–11)		SECN	2,604	43–9	3–0

NCAA Fayetteville Super Regional (0–2)
Date	Opponent	Rank (Nat'l Seed)	Site/stadium	Score	Win	Loss	Save	TV	Attendance	Overall record	NCAAT record
May 28	No. 9 (11) Arizona	No. 5 (6)	Bogle Park	**L** 4–10	Bowen (10–3)	**M. Haff** (26–7)		ESPNU	2,700	43–10	3–1
May 29	No. 9 (11) Arizona	No. 5 (6)	Bogle Park	**L** 1–4	Denham (19–8)	**A. Storms** (7–2)		ESPN2	2,749	43–11	3–2

*Denotes non–conference game • Schedule source • Rankings based on the teams' current ranking in the NFCA/USA Today poll

=== SEC Tournament ===
SEC Tournament – Second Round
(7) Tennessee Volunteers	vs.	(2) Arkansas Razorbacks

May 13, 2021, 5:00 pm (CDT) at Rhoads Stadium in Tuscaloosa, Alabama
Team	1	2	3	4	5	6	7	R	H	E
**(7) Tennessee**	0	0	0	0	1	0	0	**1**	**2**	**0**
(2) Arkansas	0	0	0	0	0	0	0	**0**	**1**	**0**
WP: Ashley Rogers (25–8) LP: Mary Haff (23–6); Home runs: TENN: Ally Shipman; ARK: None

=== NCAA Fayetteville Regional ===
Fayetteville Regional – First Round
(4) Manhattan Jaspers	vs.	(1) Arkansas Razorbacks

May 21, 2021, 12:00 pm (CDT) at Bogle Park in Fayetteville, Arkansas
Team	1	2	3	4	5	6	7	R	H	E
(4) Manhattan										
(1) Arkansas										

== Record vs. conference opponents ==
Date m/dd is for last scheduled game of series. Blank are not scheduled. Blue are home games, otherwise away.

2021 SEC softball records Source: 2021 SEC softball game results, 2021 SEC softball schedule
Team	W–L	ALA	ARK	AUB	FLA	UGA	KEN	LSU	MSU	MIZZ	MISS	SCAR	TENN	TAMU	Team	SR	SW
ALA	18–6		2–1	3–0	1–2	3–0	1–2	.	.	.	3–0	.	2–1	3–0	ALA	6–2	4–0
ARK	19–5	1–2		3–0	.	3–0	.	2–1	3–0	1–2	3–0	3–0	.	.	ARK	6–2	5–0
AUB	7–17	0–3	0–3		.	.	2–1	1–2	.	1–2	1–2	.	0–3	2–1	AUB	2–6	0–3
FLA	19–5	2–1	.	.		2–1	2–1	3–0	3–0	2–1	.	2–1	.	3–0	FLA	8–0	3–0
UGA	7–17	0–3	0–3	.	1–2		2–1	.	0–3	2–1	1–2	.	1–2	.	UGA	2–6	0–3
KEN	13–11	2–1	.	1–2	1–2	1–2		1–2	.	.	.	3–0	1–2	3–0	KEN	3–5	2–0
LSU	13–11	.	1–2	2–1	0–3	.	2–1		.	2–1	2–1	.	2–1	2–1	LSU	6–2	0–1
MSU	8–15	.	0–3	.	0–3	3–0	.	.		0–3	0–3	2–1	2–0	1–2	MSU	3–5	1–4
MIZZ	15–9	.	2–1	2–1	1–2	1–2	.	1–2	3–0		.	3–0	2–1	.	MIZZ	5–3	2–0
MISS	12–12	0–3	0–3	2–1	.	2–1	.	1–2	3–0	.		2–1	.	2–1	MISS	5–3	1–2
SCAR	4–20	.	0–3	.	1–2	.	0–3	.	1–2	0–3	1–2		1–2	0–3	SCAR	0–8	0–4
TENN	12–11	1–2	.	3–0	.	2–1	2–1	1–2	0–2	1–2	.	2–1		.	TENN	4–4	1–0
TAMU	8–16	0–3	.	1–2	0–3	.	0–3	1–2	2–1	.	1–2	3–0	.		TAMU	2–6	1–3
Team	W–L	ALA	ARK	AUB	FLA	UGA	KEN	LSU	MSU	MIZZ	MISS	SCAR	TENN	TAMU	Team	SR	SW

Updated for entire regular season.Tiebrkrs: FLA>ARK ALA common. LSU>KEN hd–hd. UGA>AUB MIZZ common.

== Rankings ==
Ranking movements Legend: ██ Increase in ranking ██ Decrease in ranking т = Tied with team above or below
	Week																
Poll	Pre	1	2	3	4	5	6	7	8	9	10	11	12	13	14	15	Final
NFCA / USA Today	18	20	21	20	19	17	15	13	10т	10	8	10	8	6	5	5	11
Softball America	16	19	18	17	15	14	14	12	10	11	10	10	7	7	6	6	10
ESPN.com/USA Softball	21	25	24	20	19	17	15	11	8т	10	6	7	6	6	6	6	11
D1Softball	16	17	16	15	12	13	12	9	8	9	7	8	8	7	6	6	11

== See also ==
- 2021 Arkansas Razorbacks baseball team
