= 2021 Ohio Valley Conference softball tournament =

- Teams: 4
- Format: Double-elimination tournament
- Finals site: Choccolocco Park; Oxford, Alabama
- Champions: Eastern Kentucky

The 2021 Ohio Valley Conference softball tournament was held at Choccolocco Park near the campus of Jacksonville State University in Oxford, Alabama from May 13 through May 15, 2021. The tournament winner earned the Ohio Valley Conference's automatic bid to the 2021 NCAA Division I softball tournament

== Tournament ==
=== Bracket ===
Thursday, May 13
1	Southeast Missouri	11
4	Jacksonville State	2
Winner's bracket
2	Eastern Kentucky	5
3	Austin Peay	2
3	Austin Peay	4
4	Jacksonville State	8
Loser's bracket

Friday, May 14
1	Southeast Missouri	1
2	Eastern Kentucky	2
4	Jacksonville State	3
1	Southeast Missouri	4

Saturday, May 15
2	Eastern Kentucky	5	–
1	Southeast Missouri	4	–
