= 2021 Southern Conference softball tournament =

- Teams: 4
- Format: Double-elimination tournament
- Finals site: UNCG Softball Stadium; Greensboro, North Carolina
- Champions: UNC Greensboro (2nd title)
- Winning coach: Janelle Breneman (2nd title)

2021 Southern Conference softball standings
	Conf.				Overall
Team	W		L	PCT	W		L	PCT
UNC Greensboro ‍†‍‡‍^{y}	14	–	4	.778	34	–	17	.667
Western Carolina ‍‍‍	12	–	5	.706	27	–	26	.509
Chattanooga ‍‍‍	8	–	8	.500	13	–	25	.342
Mercer ‍‍‍	8	–	9	.471	24	–	23	.511
Furman ‍‍‍	8	–	9	.471	20	–	28	.417
Samford ‍‍‍	7	–	11	.389	18	–	27	.400
East Tennessee State ‍‍‍	3	–	14	.176	15	–	22	.405
† – Conference champion ‡ – Tournament champion y – Invited to the NCAA tournament As of May 22, 2021; Rankings from NFCA/USA Today

The 2021 Southern Conference softball tournament was held at the UNCG Softball Stadium on the campus of the University of North Carolina at Greensboro in Greensboro, North Carolina, from May 13 through May 15, 2021. The tournament was won by the UNC Greensboro Spartans, who earned the Southern Conference's automatic bid to the 2021 NCAA Division I softball tournament

== Tournament ==
=== Bracket ===
Thursday, May 13
1	UNC Greensboro	3
4	Mercer	2
Winner's bracket
2	Western Carolina	5
3	Chattanooga	0
4	Mercer	6
3	Chattanooga	2
Loser's bracket

Friday, May 14
1	UNC Greensboro	3
3	Western Carolina	1
3	Western Carolina	4
2	Mercer	1

Saturday, May 15
1	UNC Greensboro	9	–
3	Western Carolina	4	–
