= 2021 Summit League softball tournament =

Sports tournament

- Teams: 6
- Format: Double-elimination
- Finals site: Tharaldson Park
- Champions: South Dakota State (1st title)
- Runner-up: Omaha
- Winning coach: Krista Wood (1st title)
- MVP: Jocelyn Carrillo (South Dakota State)
- Television: MidcoSN

2021 Summit League softball standings
	Conf.				Overall
Team	W		L	PCT	W		L	PCT
South Dakota State ‍†‍‡‍^{y}	21	–	1	.955	43	–	8	.843
Omaha ‍‍‍	12	–	11	.522	20	–	28	.417
North Dakota State ‍‍‍	11	–	12	.478	16	–	29	.356
Kansas City ‍‍‍	11	–	13	.458	29	–	26	.527
South Dakota ‍‍‍	8	–	12	.400	13	–	38	.255
North Dakota ‍‍‍	8	–	14	.364	17	–	33	.340
Western Illinois ‍‍‍	6	–	14	.300	16	–	29	.356
† – Conference champion ‡ – Tournament champion y – Invited to the NCAA tournament As of December 7, 2022; Rankings from NFCA/USA Today

The 2021 Summit League softball tournament took place from May 12-15, 2022. The top six regular-season finishers of the league's seven teams met in the double-elimination tournament at Tharaldson Park on the campus of North Dakota State University in Fargo, North Dakota.
North Dakota State were the defending champions, since the 2020 season was cancelled midway through due to the COVID-19 pandemic. South Dakota State won the tournament after beating Omaha in the final game. This was the Jacks' first Summit League title, and earned the league's automatic berth to the 2021 NCAA Division I softball tournament.

== Format and seeding ==
The top six teams from the regular season were seeded one through six based on conference record during the league regular season. The tournament played out as a modified double-elimination tournament, with the bottom four seeds playing each other in the single-elimination first round and the rest of the tournament as a double-elimination.

== Schedule ==
Game	Time*	Matchup^{#}	Television	Location	Attendance
First Round – Wednesday, May 12
1	3:00 PM	#5 South Dakota 2 vs. #4 Kansas City 10	MidcoSN	Tharaldson Park	
2	5:30 PM	#3 North Dakota State 5 vs.^{(10)} #6 North Dakota 6	MidcoSN	Tharaldson Park	
Quarterfinals – Thursday, May 13
3	12:00 PM	#1 South Dakota State 2 vs. #4 Kansas City 4	MidcoSN	Tharaldson Park	
4	2:30 PM	#2 Omaha 5 vs. #6 North Dakota 0	MidcoSN	Tharaldson Park	
5	5:00 PM	#1 South Dakota State 1 vs. #6 North Dakota 0	MidcoSN	Tharaldson Park	
Semifinals – Friday, May 14
6	1:00 PM	#2 Omaha 2 vs. #4 Kansas City 0	MidcoSN	Tharaldson Park	
7	3:30 PM	#1 South Dakota State 7 vs. #4 Kansas City 0	MidcoSN	Tharaldson Park	
Finals – Saturday, May 15
8	1:00 PM	#1 South Dakota State 9 vs. #2 Omaha 0	MidcoSN	Tharaldson Park	
9	3:15 PM	#1 South Dakota State 4 vs. #2 Omaha 2	MidcoSN	Tharaldson Park	
*Game times in CDT. # - Rankings denote tournament seed. Reference:

== All-Tournament Team ==
The following players were named to the All-Tournament Team:

Player	School
Jocelyn Carrillo (MVP)	South Dakota State
Kelsey Lenox	South Dakota State
Tori Kniesche	South Dakota State
Rozelyn Carrillo	South Dakota State
Grace Glanzer	South Dakota State
Jamie White	Omaha
Taylor Johnson	Omaha
Lynsey Tucker	Omaha
Kamryn Meyer	Omaha
Faith Willis	Kansas City
Sydney McQuinn	Kansas City
Mia Hoveland	Kansas City
Mariah Peters	North Dakota
Jannay Jones	North Dakota
Ciara Jensen	North Dakota State
Jadyn DeWitte	South Dakota
