= Cayla Drotar =

American softball player

Personal information
- Born: January 27, 1998 (age 28) Hartsville, South Carolina, U.S.
- Height: 5 ft 6 in (1.68 m)

Sport
- Country: USA
- Sport: Softball
- College team: South Carolina Gamecocks

Cayla Nicole Drotar (born January 27, 1998) is an American softball player. She attended Hartsville High School in Hartsville, South Carolina. She later attended the University of South Carolina, where she pitched for the South Carolina Gamecocks softball team.
