= 2021 Alabama Crimson Tide softball team =

American college softball season

2021 Alabama Crimson Tide softball

SEC Tournament Champions Tuscaloosa Regional Champions Tuscaloosa Super Regional Champions Women's College World Series Appearance
- Conference: Southeastern Conference
- West
- Record: 52-9 (18–6 SEC)
- Head coach: Patrick Murphy
- Assistant coach: Alyson Habetz
- Pitching coach: Stephanie VanBrakle
- Home stadium: Rhoads Stadium

2021 Southeastern Conference softball standings
	Conf.				Overall
Team	W		L	PCT	W		L	PCT
No. 9 Florida ‍†‍‍^{y}	19	–	5	.792	45	–	11	.804
No. 11 Arkansas ‍†‍‍^{y}	19	–	5	.792	43	–	11	.796
No. 3 Alabama ‍‍‡‍^{y}	18	–	6	.750	52	–	9	.852
No. 13 Missouri ‍‍‍^{y}	15	–	9	.625	42	–	17	.712
No. 16 Kentucky ‍‍‍^{y}	13	–	11	.542	43	–	16	.729
No. 15 LSU ‍‍‍^{y}	13	–	11	.542	35	–	22	.614
No. 22 Tennessee ‍‍‍^{y}	12	–	11	.522	42	–	15	.737
Ole Miss ‍‍‍^{y}	12	–	12	.500	36	–	22	.621
Mississippi State ‍‍‍^{y}	8	–	15	.348	35	–	25	.583
Texas A&M ‍‍‍^{y}	8	–	16	.333	32	–	23	.582
No. 8 Georgia ‍‍‍^{y}	7	–	17	.292	34	–	23	.596
Auburn ‍‍‍^{y}	7	–	17	.292	27	–	24	.529
South Carolina ‍‍‍	4	–	20	.167	26	–	26	.500
† – Conference champion ‡ – Tournament champion y – Invited to the NCAA tournament As of June 7, 2021; Rankings from NFCA/USA Today

The 2021 Alabama Crimson Tide softball team was an American college softball team that represented the University of Alabama during the 2021 NCAA Division I softball season. The Crimson Tide were led by Patrick Murphy in his twenty-second season, and played their home games at Rhoads Stadium. They competed in the Southeastern Conference, where they finished the season with a 52–9 record and an 18-6 conference record.

The Crimson Tide won the 2021 SEC Tournament, and qualified for the 2021 NCAA Division I softball tournament. They advanced to their 13th 2021 Women's College World Series, where they were eventually defeated by Florida State in the semifinals.

== Roster ==
2021 Alabama Crimson Tide roster
Pitchers: 14 – Montana Fouts – Junior; 20 – Sarah Cornell – Redshirt Senior; 21 – Jaala Torrence – Freshman; 27 – Krytal Goodman – Senior; 44 – Lexi Kilfoyl – Sophomore; Catchers: 4 – Abby Doerr – Sophomore; Outfielders: 1 – Elissa Brown – Redshirt Senior; 8 – KB Sides – Senior; 10 – Kayla Davis – Junior; 11 – Alexis Mack – Redshirt Senior; 18 – Jenna Johnson – Sophomore; 32 – Kat Grill – Freshman	Infielders: 00 – Maddie Morgan – Senior; 5 – Kyra Lockhart – Junior; 7 – Bailey Dowling – Freshman; 9 – Taylor Clark – Redshirt Senior; 12 – Kaylee Tow – Senior; 23 – Savannah Woodard – Sophomore; 33 – Claire Jenkins – Redshirt Senior; Utility: 16 – Bailey Hemphill – Redshirt Senior; 24 – KJ Haney – Freshman

== Schedule ==
Date	Time	Opponent	Rank^{#}	Site	Result	Attendance	Winning Pitcher	Losing Pitcher
Stinger Classic
February 12*	5:00 PM	Alabama State	#8	Barbara Williams Softball Complex • Montgomery, AL	W 10–0^{(5)}	186	Fouts	Bradford
February 13*	4:30 PM	Notre Dame	#8	Barbara Williams Softball Complex • Montgomery, AL	W 10–0^{(5)}	147	Kilfoyl	Tidd
February 14*	12 PM	Louisville	#8	Rhoads Stadium • Tuscaloosa, AL	W 5–0	-	Fouts	Roby
February 14*	2 PM	Louisville	#8	Rhoads Stadium • Tuscaloosa, AL	W 4-0	-	Kilfoyl	Leonhardt
Easton Bama Bash
February 19*	3 PM	Liberty	#5	Rhoads Stadium • Tuscaloosa, AL	W 6-3	1121	Kilfoyl	Johnson
February 19*	1:30 PM	Liberty	#5	Rhoads Stadium • Tuscaloosa, AL	W 8-1	1121	Fouts	Kirby
February 20*	4 PM	LSU	#5	Rhoads Stadium • Tuscaloosa, AL	W 5-2	1121	Kilfoyl	Sunseri
February 21*	4 PM	LSU	#5	Rhoads Stadium • Tuscaloosa, AL	W 13-5^{(5)}	1121	Fouts	Wickersham
February 24*	6 PM	UAB	#4	Rhoads Stadium • Tuscaloosa, AL	W 7-1^{(6)}	1121	Cornell	Woodham
Easton Crimson Classic
February 26*	4:00 PM	Memphis	#4	Rhoads Stadium • Tuscaloosa, AL	W 8-3	1121	Fouts	Ellett
February 26*	6:00 PM	Memphis	#4	Rhoads Stadium • Tuscaloosa, AL	W 5-1	1121	Goodman	Nichols
February 27*	11:00 AM	UNC	#4	Rhoads Stadium • Tuscaloosa, AL	W 2-0	1121	Kilfoyl	George
February 27*	1:00 PM	UNC	#4	Rhoads Stadium • Tuscaloosa, AL	W 2-0	1121	Fouts	Pickett
February 28*	1:00 PM	Troy	#4	Rhoads Stadium • Tuscaloosa, AL	W 2-0	1121	Kilfoyl	Johnson
March 3*	6:00 PM	Mississippi State	#3	Rhoads Stadium • Tuscaloosa, AL	W 4-0	1121	Fouts	Wesley
Easton T-Town Showdown
March 5*	4:00 PM	Kent State	#3	Rhoads Stadium • Tuscaloosa, AL	W 9-1^{6}	1121	Kilfoyl	Lebeau
March 5*	6:00 PM	Kent State	#3	Rhoads Stadium • Tuscaloosa, AL	W 11-3^{6}	1121	Goodman	Sherman
March 6*	11:00 AM	UNI	#3	Rhoads Stadium • Tuscaloosa, AL	W 5-3	1121	Cornell, Torrence (S)	Oler
March 6*	1:00 PM	UNI	#3	Rhoads Stadium • Tuscaloosa, AL	W 8-0^{5}	1121	Torrence	Packard
March 7*	4:00 PM	South Alabama	#3	Rhoads Stadium • Tuscaloosa, AL	L 0-1	1121	Lackie	Fouts
March 12	5:00 PM	Auburn	#4	Jane B. Moore Field • Auburn, AL	W 6-0	370	Kilfoyl	Penta
March 13	4:00 PM	Auburn	#4	Jane B. Moore Field • Auburn, AL	W 4-1	370	Fouts	Lowe
March 14	2:00 PM	Auburn	#4	Jane B. Moore Field • Auburn, AL	W 4-2	370	Kilfoyl	Penta
March 19	6:00 PM	Tennessee	#3	Rhoads Stadium • Tuscaloosa, AL	L 3-4	1121	Rogers	Fouts
March 20	2:00 PM	Tennessee	#3	Rhoads Stadium • Tuscaloosa, AL	W 7-1	1121	Kilfoyl	Turner
March 21	1:00 PM	Tennessee	#3	Rhoads Stadium • Tuscaloosa, AL	W 3-0	1121	Fouts	Rogers
March 24*	6:00 PM	North Alabama	#4	Rhoads Stadium • Tuscaloosa, AL	W 5-0	1121	Torrence	Garst
March 27	1:00 PM	Kentucky	#4	John Cropp Stadium • Lexington, KY	W 11-6	623	Fouts	Sprangler
March 28	2:30 PM	Kentucky	#4	John Cropp Stadium • Lexington, KY	L 2-4	658	Humes	Kilfoyl
March 29	6:00 PM	Kentucky	#4	John Cropp Stadium • Lexington, KY	L 4-5^{8}	488	Humes	Kilfoyl
April 1	5:00 PM	Texas A&M	#4	Rhoads Stadium • Tuscaloosa, AL	W 11-3^{5}	1121	Kilfoyl	Herzog
April 2	5:00 PM	Texas A&M	#4	Rhoads Stadium • Tuscaloosa, AL	W 8-6	1121	Fouts, Kilfoyl (S)	Uribe
April 3	11:00 AM	Texas A&M	#4	Rhoads Stadium • Tuscaloosa, AL	W 14-6^{6}	1121	Goodman	Uribe
April 9	5:00 PM	Arkansas	#4	Bogle Park • Fayetteville, AR	W 5-3	1100	Fouts	Haff
April 10	11:00 AM	Arkansas	#4	Bogle Park • Fayetteville, AR	L 0-4	1221	Storms	Kilfoyl
April 11	1:00 PM	Arkansas	#4	Bogle Park • Fayetteville, AR	W 2-0	1236	Fouts	Storms
April 14*	6:00 PM	Alabama State	#3	Rhoads Stadium • Tuscaloosa, AL	W 11-3^{(5)}	1121	Goodman	Bradford
April 16	6:00 PM	Florida	#3	Rhoads Stadium • Tuscaloosa, AL	L 0-2	1529	Hightower	Fouts
April 17	1:00 PM	Florida	#3	Rhoads Stadium • Tuscaloosa, AL	L 2-9	1631	Lugo, Chronister (S)	Goodman
April 16	1:00 PM	Florida	#3	Rhoads Stadium • Tuscaloosa, AL	W 4-2	1631	Fouts	Hightower
April 21*	6:00 PM	Southern Mississippi	#5	Rhoads Stadium • Tuscaloosa, AL	W 6-3	1631	Goodman, Fouts (S)	Pierce
April 24*	1:30 PM	Louisiana	#5	Rhoads Stadium • Tuscaloosa, AL	W 5-3	1413	Fouts	Ellyson
April 25*	1:30 PM	Louisiana	#5	Rhoads Stadium • Tuscaloosa, AL	W 5-1	1596	Goodman, Fouts (S)	Lamb
April 30	5:00 PM	Georgia	#4	Jack Turner Stadium • Athens, GA	W 4-1	400	Fouts	Avant
May 1	12:00 PM	Georgia	#4	Jack Turner Stadium • Athens, GA	W 13-3	400	Goodman	Avant
May 2	2:00 PM	Georgia	#4	Jack Turner Stadium • Athens, GA	W 6-3	400	Fouts	Britton
May 6	6:00 PM	Ole Miss	#3	Rhoads Stadium • Tuscaloosa, AL	W 8-0^{5}	1419	Fouts	Tillmann
May 7	6:00 PM	Ole Miss	#3	Rhoads Stadium • Tuscaloosa, AL	W 11-7	1631	Goodman	Borgen
May 8	11:00 AM	Ole Miss	#3	Rhoads Stadium • Tuscaloosa, AL	W 6-1	1631	Fouts	Borgen
2021 SEC softball tournament
May 13	7:00 PM	Kentucky	#3	Rhoads Stadium • Tuscaloosa, AL	W 5-1	1582	Fouts	Humes
May 14	6:30 PM	Tennessee	#3	Rhoads Stadium • Tuscaloosa, AL	W 6-5	1660	Fouts	Bender
May 15	5:00 PM	Florida	#3	Rhoads Stadium • Tuscaloosa, AL	W 4-0	1924	Fouts	Hightower
NCAA Tuscaloosa Regional
May 21*	5:00 PM	Alabama State	#3	Rhoads Stadium • Tuscaloosa, AL	W 9-0^{(6)}	2912	Kilfoyl	Sullivan
May 22*	11:00 AM	Clemson	#3	Rhoads Stadium • Tuscaloosa, AL	W 6-0	-	Fouts	Cagle
May 23*	1:00 PM	Clemson	#3	Rhoads Stadium • Tuscaloosa, AL	W 5-0	3044	Fouts	Cagle
NCAA Tuscaloosa Super Regional
May 28	12:00 PM	Kentucky	#3	Rhoads Stadium • Tuscaloosa, AL	W 4-3	3633	Fouts	Humes
May 29	1:00 PM	Kentucky	#3	Rhoads Stadium • Tuscaloosa, AL	W 4-1	3633	Kilfoyl	Baalman
Women's College World Series
June 3*	6:00 PM	Arizona	#3	USA Softball Hall of Fame Stadium • Oklahoma City, OK	W 5-1	-	Fouts	Bowen
June 4*	8:30 PM	UCLA	#3	USA Softball Hall of Fame Stadium • Oklahoma City, OK	W 6-0	12337	Fouts	Garcia
June 6	2:30 PM	Florida State	#3	USA Softball Hall of Fame Stadium • Oklahoma City, OK	L 0-2	12370	Sandercock	Kilfoyl
June 7	6:00 PM	Florida State	#3	USA Softball Hall of Fame Stadium • Oklahoma City, OK	L 5-8	9916	Watson	Fouts
*Non-Conference Game. ^{#}Rankings from NFCA released prior to game.All times are in Central Time Zone.

== Record vs. conference opponents ==
Date m/dd is for last scheduled game of series. Blank are not scheduled. Blue are home games, otherwise away.

2021 SEC softball records Source: 2021 SEC softball game results, 2021 SEC softball schedule
Team	W–L	ALA	ARK	AUB	FLA	UGA	KEN	LSU	MSU	MIZZ	MISS	SCAR	TENN	TAMU	Team	SR	SW
ALA	18–6		2–1	3–0	1–2	3–0	1–2	.	.	.	3–0	.	2–1	3–0	ALA	6–2	4–0
ARK	19–5	1–2		3–0	.	3–0	.	2–1	3–0	1–2	3–0	3–0	.	.	ARK	6–2	5–0
AUB	7–17	0–3	0–3		.	.	2–1	1–2	.	1–2	1–2	.	0–3	2–1	AUB	2–6	0–3
FLA	19–5	2–1	.	.		2–1	2–1	3–0	3–0	2–1	.	2–1	.	3–0	FLA	8–0	3–0
UGA	7–17	0–3	0–3	.	1–2		2–1	.	0–3	2–1	1–2	.	1–2	.	UGA	2–6	0–3
KEN	13–11	2–1	.	1–2	1–2	1–2		1–2	.	.	.	3–0	1–2	3–0	KEN	3–5	2–0
LSU	13–11	.	1–2	2–1	0–3	.	2–1		.	2–1	2–1	.	2–1	2–1	LSU	6–2	0–1
MSU	8–15	.	0–3	.	0–3	3–0	.	.		0–3	0–3	2–1	2–0	1–2	MSU	3–5	1–4
MIZZ	15–9	.	2–1	2–1	1–2	1–2	.	1–2	3–0		.	3–0	2–1	.	MIZZ	5–3	2–0
MISS	12–12	0–3	0–3	2–1	.	2–1	.	1–2	3–0	.		2–1	.	2–1	MISS	5–3	1–2
SCAR	4–20	.	0–3	.	1–2	.	0–3	.	1–2	0–3	1–2		1–2	0–3	SCAR	0–8	0–4
TENN	12–11	1–2	.	3–0	.	2–1	2–1	1–2	0–2	1–2	.	2–1		.	TENN	4–4	1–0
TAMU	8–16	0–3	.	1–2	0–3	.	0–3	1–2	2–1	.	1–2	3–0	.		TAMU	2–6	1–3
Team	W–L	ALA	ARK	AUB	FLA	UGA	KEN	LSU	MSU	MIZZ	MISS	SCAR	TENN	TAMU	Team	SR	SW

Updated for entire regular season.Tiebrkrs: FLA>ARK ALA common. LSU>KEN hd–hd. UGA>AUB MIZZ common.

== Rankings ==
Poll	Pre	Wk 1	Wk 2	Wk 3	Wk 4	Wk 5	Wk 6	Wk 7	Wk 8	Wk 9	Wk 10	Wk 11	Wk 12	Wk 13	Wk 14	Final
NFCA	8	5	4	3	4	2	4	4	4	3	5	4	3	3	3	3
USA Softball	8	6	3	2	4	3	3	4	3	3	5	4	3	3	3	3

== Awards and honors ==
Weekly Awards
Player	Award	Date Awarded	Ref.
Montana Fouts	SEC Pitcher of the Week	February 15, 2021	
Kaylee Tow	SEC Player of the Week	February 22, 2021	
Kaylee Tow	NFCA National Player of the Week	February 23, 2021	
Kaylee Tow	D1Softball Player of the Week	February 23, 2021	
Bailey Hemphill	SEC Player of the Week	March 16, 2021	
Lexi Kilfoyl	SEC Newcomer of the Week	March 16, 2021	
Bailey Hemphill	SEC Player of the Week	April 6, 2021	
Lexi Kilfoyl	SEC Newcomer of the Week	April 6, 2021	
Montana Fouts	SEC Pitcher of the Week	April 13, 2021	
Montana Fouts	D1Softball Pitcher of the Week	April 13, 2021	
Montana Fouts	SEC Pitcher of the Week	April 27, 2021	
Savannah Woodard	SEC Newcomer of the Week	May 4, 2021	
Montana Fouts	SEC Pitcher of the Week	May 10, 2021	

Individual Awards
Player	Award	Ref.
Montana Fouts	SEC Co-Pitcher of the Year; NFCA National Pitcher of the Year	
Bailey Hemphill	SEC Player of the Year	

All-SEC
Player	Selection	Ref.
Elissa Brown	First Team	
Alexis Mack	First Team	
Montana Fouts	First Team	
Bailey Hemphill	First Team	
Kaylee Tow	Second Team	
Lexi Kilfoyl	Newcomer Team	
Savannah Woodard	Newcomer Team	
KB Sides	Defensive Team	

All-American
Player	Selection	Ref.
Montana Fouts	First Team	
Bailey Hemphill	First Team	
Kaylee Tow	Third Team	
