= Bailey Hemphill =

American softball player

Bailey "Boobie" Hemphill
- Utility
- Born: February 17, 1998 (age 27); Lafayette, Louisiana, U.S.
- Batted: Right Threw: Right

NCAA debut
- February 10, 2017, for the Alabama Crimson Tide

Last appearance
- June 7, 2021, for the Alabama Crimson Tide

NCAA statistics
- Batting average: .344
- Home runs: 64
- Runs batted in: 246

Teams
- Alabama (2017–2021)

Career highlights and awards
- First Team All-American (2021); SEC Champion (2021); SEC Player of the Year (2021); 2× Women's College World Series All-Tournament Team (2019, 2021); Second Team All-American (2019); SEC All-Freshman Team (2017)

Bailey Marie Hemphill (born February 17, 1998) is an American former All-American softball player for the Alabama Crimson Tide. She currently holds the Alabama record for the most career home runs hit with 64, as well as the SEC record for most career walks with 237.

== Early life ==
Hemphill attended St. Thomas More High School in Lafayette, Louisiana, where she was a two time NFCA High School All-American and broke her school's all-time career home run record after two seasons. She was named Louisiana's Miss Softball her senior year in 2016.

== College career ==
=== Freshman season ===
During her first career at-bat on February 10, 2017, Hemphill hit a three-run home run against Towson in her Alabama debut. She finished the 2017 season with a .309 batting average and 47 hits. In addition, Hemphill led the team with 9 home runs, 41 RBIs, and 57 walks and was named to the SEC All-Freshman Team. In the field, Hemphill mainly played first base and occasionally catcher, but for the majority of games she was used as a designated hitter. During a match against Ole Miss on May 5, 2017, Hemphill hit a solo home run and had an early celebration with her team. However, she was tagged and called out due to Hemphill not touching home plate (she had jumped over the plate to her team in her excitement at the home run). The game ended with an Ole Miss victory, 5–4.

=== Sophomore year ===
In the 2018 season, Hemphill had a .333 batting average with 41 hits, 48 RBIs, and 13 home runs. She missed two weeks of the season due to a foot injury, only starting 49 of 56 games. Hemphill primarily played first base her sophomore season.

=== Junior Year ===
During her junior year, Hemphill led Alabama with a .372 batting average and 72 hits and was either a first baseman or a designated hitter. She set a single-season school record with 26 home runs (tying the SEC record) and 84 RBIs (leading the NCAA). She helped Alabama reach their first Women's College World Series since 2016, where she hit her record-breaking 26th home run on June 1, 2019, in a 15–3 victory against Florida that kept them alive in the loser's bracket. Alabama eventually reached the tournament semi-finals and were eliminated by Oklahoma, and Hemphill made the 2019 Women's College World Series All-Tournament team.

Following the 2019 season, Hemphill was named an NFCA Second Team All-American and First Team All-SEC.

=== Senior Year ===
In a 2020 season shortened by the COVID-19 pandemic, Hemphill batted .280 and recorded 14 hits, 10 RBIs, and 4 homeruns in 22 games. She was nominated for the NCAA Woman of the Year Award in July 2020.

=== Redshirt senior year ===
Hemphill chose to return for her fifth year of eligibility in 2021, and finished the season leading the team with a .419 batting average, 14 home runs, 57 RBIs, 57 walks, a .581 on-base percentage, and a .770 slugging percentage. Due to the departure of veteran catcher Reagan Dykes, Hemphill played most games as the starting catcher for Alabama.

On May 14, she hit her 61st home run against Tennessee in the SEC tournament semi-finals to become the Alabama all-time career home run leader. Hemphill helped Alabama win their first SEC Tournament Championship since 2012 after the team defeated Florida on May 15, recording three home runs in the tournament. In the opening round of the 2021 Women's College World Series on June 3, against Arizona, Hemphill hit a solo home run to help Alabama win 5–1 and advance to the second round of the tournament. On June 6, Hemphill recorded her 237th career walk in the first match of the Women's College World Series semi-finals, against Florida State, making her the SEC record-holder for most career walks. A day later, she hit a two-run homer against Florida State in the second semi-final game, but Alabama eventually lost the game 8–5 and was thus eliminated. At the end of the tournament, Hemphill was named onto the 2021 Women's College World Series All-Tournament Team.

Hemphill finished the 2021 season as an NFCA First-Team All American, First Team All-SEC player, the SEC Player of the Year, and a finalist for the USA Softball Collegiate Player of the Year award.

== Statistics ==
YEAR	G	AB	R	H	BA	RBI	HR	3B	2B	TB	SLG	BB	SO	SB	SBA
2017	63	152	29	47	.309	41	9	2	5	83	.546%	57	20	3	3
2018	49	123	26	41	.333	48	13	0	9	89	.724%	40	22	0	1
2019	70	192	44	72	.375	84	26	0	9	159	.828%	59	19	1	2
2020	22	50	9	14	.280	10	2	0	0	20	.400%	24	4	2	2
2021	61	147	47	62	.422	57	14	1	8	114	.776%	57	6	0	0
TOTALS	265	664	155	236	.344	246	64	3	31	465	.655%	237	71	6	8

== See also ==
- Montana Fouts
- Alabama Crimson Tide softball
