= 2021 NCAA Division I softball tournament =

College softball tournament

- Teams: 64
- Finals site: USA Softball Hall of Fame Stadium; Oklahoma City
- Champions: Oklahoma (5th title)
- Runner-up: Florida State (11th WCWS Appearance)
- Winning coach: Patty Gasso (5th title)
- MOP: Giselle Juarez (Oklahoma)
- Television: ESPN; ESPN2; ESPN3; ABC

The 2021 NCAA Division I softball tournament was held from May 21 through June 10, 2021 as the final part of the 2021 NCAA Division I softball season. 31 teams were awarded automatic bids as champions of their conferences after the Ivy League opted out of the 2021 softball season. The remaining 33 were selected at-large by the NCAA Division I softball selection committee on May 16, 2021. The tournament culminated with eight teams playing in the 2021 Women's College World Series at USA Softball Hall of Fame Stadium in Oklahoma City.

== Bids ==
=== Automatic bids ===
The Big Ten, Big West, Mountain West, Pac-12, and West Coast Conference bids were awarded to the regular-season champion. All other conferences had their automatic bid go to the conference tournament winner.

Conference	School	Best finish	Reference
America East	UMBC	Regionals (2002, 2019)	
American	Wichita State	Regionals (1989, 2005, 2016, 2018)	
ACC	Duke	First appearance	
A-10	George Washington	First appearance	
ASUN	Liberty	Regionals (2002, 2011, 2018)	
Big 12	Oklahoma	Champions (2000, 2013, 2016, 2017)	
Big East	Villanova	First appearance	
Big Sky	Portland State	Regionals (2013)	
Big South	Campbell	Regionals (1995, 2008, 2009)	
Big Ten	Michigan	Champions (2005)	
Big West	Long Beach State	WCWS (1986, 1990, 1991, 1992, 1993)	
CAA	James Madison	Super Regionals (2016, 2019)	
Conference USA	Western Kentucky	Regionals (2013, 2015)	
Horizon League	UIC	WCWS (1994)	
Ivy League	Ivy League season canceled		
MAC	Miami (OH)	Regionals (2005, 2009, 2012, 2016)	
MAAC	Manhattan	Regionals (1999)	
MEAC	Morgan State	First appearance	
MVC	Southern Illinois	WCWS (1970, 1977, 1978)	
Mountain West	Fresno State	Champions (1998)	
Northeast	Saint Francis (PA)	Regionals (2017, 2018, 2019)	
OVC	Eastern Kentucky	Regionals (2002, 2004)	
Pac-12	UCLA	Champions (1982, 1984, 1985, 1988, 1989, 1990, 1992, 1999, 2003, 2004, 2010, 2019)	
Patriot League	Boston University	Regionals (1996, 2002, 2003, 2009, 2010, 2012, 2014, 2016, 2018, 2019)	
SEC	Alabama	Champions (2012)	
SoCon	UNC Greensboro	Regionals (1997, 2018)	
Southland	McNeese State	Regionals (1994, 2005, 2010, 2016, 2017, 2018)	
SWAC	Alabama State	Regionals (2016, 2019)	
Summit League	South Dakota State	First appearance	
Sun Belt	Louisiana	WCWS (1993, 1995, 1996, 2003, 2008, 2014)	
WAC	Seattle	Regionals (2019)	
West Coast	BYU	Super Regionals (2010)	

=== At-large ===
Team	Conference
Arizona	Pac-12
Arizona State	Pac-12
Arkansas	SEC
Auburn	SEC
Baylor	Big 12
Clemson	ACC
Florida	SEC
Florida State	ACC
Georgia	SEC
Iowa State	Big 12
Kentucky	SEC
Kennesaw State	ASUN
LSU	SEC
Minnesota	Big Ten
Mississippi State	SEC
Missouri	SEC
Northern Iowa	MVC
Northwestern	Big Ten
Notre Dame	ACC
Oklahoma State	Big 12
Ole Miss	SEC
Oregon	Pac-12
South Alabama	Sun Belt
South Florida	American
Stanford	Pac-12
Tennessee	SEC
Texas	Big 12
Texas A&M	SEC
Texas State	Sun Belt
Troy	Sun Belt
UCF	American
Virginia Tech	ACC
Washington	Pac-12

=== By conference ===
Conference	Total	Schools
SEC	12	Alabama, Arkansas, Auburn, Florida, Georgia, Kentucky, LSU, Mississippi State, Missouri, Ole Miss, Tennessee, Texas A&M
Pac-12	6	Arizona, Arizona State, Oregon, Stanford, UCLA, Washington
ACC	5	Clemson, Duke, Florida State, Notre Dame, Virginia Tech
Big 12	5	Baylor, Iowa State, Oklahoma, Oklahoma State, Texas
Sun Belt	4	Louisiana, South Alabama, Texas State, Troy
American	3	South Florida, UCF, Wichita State
Big Ten	3	Michigan, Minnesota, Northwestern
ASUN	2	Liberty, Kennesaw State
Missouri Valley	2	Northern Iowa, Southern Illinois
Mountain West	1	Fresno State
America East	1	UMBC
Atlantic 10	1	George Washington
Big East	1	Villanova
Big Sky	1	Portland State
Big South	1	Campbell
Big West	1	Long Beach State
Colonial	1	James Madison
Conference USA	1	Western Kentucky
Horizon	1	UIC
MAAC	1	Manhattan
Mid-American	1	Miami (OH)
Mid-Eastern	1	Morgan State
Northeast	1	Saint Francis (PA)
Ohio Valley	1	Eastern Kentucky
Patriot	1	Boston University
SoCon	1	UNC Greensboro
Southland	1	McNeese State
Southwestern	1	Alabama State
Summit	1	South Dakota State
WAC	1	Seattle
West Coast	1	BYU

== National seeds ==
16 National Seeds were announced on the Selection Show, on Sunday, May 16 at 9 p.m. EDT on ESPN2. 15 of the 16 national seeds hosted Regionals. Teams in italics advanced to Super Regionals. Teams in bold advanced to the Women's College World Series.

1. **Oklahoma**
2. **UCLA**
3. **Alabama**
4. Florida
5. **Oklahoma State**
6. Arkansas
7. LSU
8. Missouri

9. Tennessee
10. **Florida State**
11. **Arizona**
12. Texas
13. Duke (not a host)
14. Kentucky
15. Arizona State
16. Washington

== Regionals and Super Regionals ==
The Regionals took place May 20–23. The Super Regionals took place May 27–30.

=== Norman Super Regional ===
Round 1	Round 2
1	**Oklahoma**	**19**^{(5)}
Morgan State	0
1	**Oklahoma**	**7**
Wichita State	5
Texas A&M	7
**Wichita State**	**9**
Norman Regional – OU Softball Complex
Morgan State	3
**Texas A&M**	**10**
**Wichita State**	**9**
Texas A&M	6
16	**Washington**	**3**
Portland State	0
16	Washington	1
**Michigan**	**2**
Seattle	0
**Michigan**	**2**
Seattle Regional – Husky Softball Stadium
Portland State	5
**Seattle**	**6**
16	**Washington**	**8**^{(5)}
Seattle	0

Regional Finals
1	**Oklahoma**	**24**	—
Wichita State	7	—
Michigan	0	5
16	**Washington**	**2**	**10**

Super Regionals
1	**Oklahoma**	**4**	**9**^{(5)}	—
16	Washington	2	1	—

=== Columbia Super Regional ===
Round 1	Round 2
8	**Missouri**	**8**^{(6)}
UIC	0
8	**Missouri**	**4**
Northern Iowa	0
**Northern Iowa**	**8**^{(5)}
Iowa State	0
Columbia Regional – Mizzou Softball Stadium
**Iowa State**	**4**
UIC	0
Northern Iowa	3
**Iowa State**	**4**
9	**Tennessee**	**8**
Eastern Kentucky	1
9	Tennessee	1
**James Madison**	**3**
**James Madison**	**4**^{(10)}
Liberty	3
Knoxville Regional – Sherri Parker Lee Stadium
**Liberty**	**5**
Eastern Kentucky	1
9	Tennessee	1
**Liberty**	**3**

Regional Finals
8	**Missouri**	**5**	—
Iowa State	0	—
**James Madison**	**8**	—
Liberty	5	—

Super Regionals
8	Missouri	1	**7**	2
**James Madison**	**2**	1	**7**

=== Stillwater Super Regional ===
Round 1	Round 2
5	**Oklahoma State**	**10**^{(5)}
Campbell	0
5	**Oklahoma State**	**9**
Mississippi State	3
Boston University	1
**Mississippi State**	**3**
Stillwater Regional – Cowgirl Stadium
**Campbell**	**7**
Boston University	1
**Mississippi State**	**12**^{(5)}
Campbell	0
12	**Texas**	**12**^{(5)}
Saint Francis (PA)	0
12	**Texas**	**6**
Texas State	0
**Texas State**	**5**
Oregon	1
Austin Regional – Red and Charline McCombs Field
**Oregon**	**7**
Saint Francis (PA)	0
Texas State	0
**Oregon**	**2**

Regional Finals
5	**Oklahoma State**	**10**^{(5)}	—
Mississippi State	2	—
12	**Texas**	2	**1**
Oregon	**3**^{(8)}	0

Super Regionals
5	**Oklahoma State**	**6**	2	**2**
12	Texas	1	**4**	0

=== Gainesville Super Regional ===
Round 1	Round 2
4	**Florida**	**1**
South Florida	0
4	**Florida**	**10**
South Alabama	0
**South Alabama**	**2**
Baylor	0
Gainesville Regional – Katie Seashole Pressly Softball Stadium
Baylor	0
**South Florida**	**5**
South Alabama	0
**South Florida**	**1**
13	**Duke**	**2**
UNC Greensboro	0
13	Duke	0
**Georgia**	**1**
Western Kentucky	3
**Georgia**	**11**^{(6)}
Athens Regional – Jack Turner Stadium
UNC Greensboro	4
**Western Kentucky**	**8**
13	**Duke**	**4**^{(12)}
Western Kentucky	0

Regional Finals
4	**Florida**	**8**	—
South Florida	0	—
**Georgia**	**10**	—
13	Duke	9	—

Super Regionals
4	Florida	0	0	—
**Georgia**	**4**	**6**	—

=== Tuscaloosa Super Regional ===
Round 1	Round 2
3	**Alabama**	**9**^{(6)}
Alabama State	0
3	**Alabama**	**6**
Clemson	0
Troy	0
**Clemson**	**8**^{(5)}
Tuscaloosa Regional – Rhoads Stadium
Alabama State	0
**Troy**	**8**^{(6)}
**Clemson**	**4**
Troy	2
14	**Kentucky**	**3**
Northwestern	2
14	Kentucky	3
**Notre Dame**	**12**^{(5)}
Miami (OH)	2
**Notre Dame**	**3**
Lexington Regional – John Cropp Stadium
**Northwestern**	**7**
Miami (OH)	1
14	**Kentucky**	**7**
Northwestern	2

Regional Finals
3	**Alabama**	**5**	—
Clemson	0	—
Notre Dame	0	0
14	**Kentucky**	**7**	**4**

Super Regionals
3	**Alabama**	**4**	**4**	—
14	Kentucky	3	1	—

=== Fayetteville Super Regional ===
Round 1	Round 2
6	**Arkansas**	**8**^{(5)}
Manhattan	0
6	**Arkansas**	**4**
South Dakota State	0
**South Dakota State**	**7**
Stanford	1
Fayetteville Regional – Bogle Park
**Stanford**	**11**
Manhattan	2
South Dakota State	1
**Stanford**	**2**^{(10)}
11	**Arizona**	**7**
UMBC	0
11	**Arizona**	**12**
Ole Miss	6
Villanova	1
**Ole Miss**	**5**
Tucson Regional – Rita Hillenbrand Memorial Stadium
UMBC	3
**Villanova**	**4**
**Ole Miss**	**6**
Villanova	2

Regional Finals
6	**Arkansas**	**7**	—
Stanford	3	—
11	**Arizona**	**12**	—
Ole Miss	6	—

Super Regionals
6	Arkansas	4	1	—
11	**Arizona**	**10**	**4**	—

=== Baton Rouge Super Regional ===
Round 1	Round 2
7	**LSU**	**10**^{(6)}
McNeese State	2
7	**LSU**	**10**
Louisiana	3
George Washington	0
**Louisiana**	**1**^{(11)}
Baton Rouge Regional – Tiger Park
**McNeese State**	**12**^{(5)}
George Washington	0
**Louisiana**	**4**
McNeese State	0
10	**Florida State**	**6**
Kennesaw State	2
10	**Florida State**	**3**
UCF	0
**UCF**	**5**
Auburn	4
Tallahassee Regional – JoAnne Graf Field
Auburn	0
**Kennesaw State**	**1**
**UCF**	**2**
Kennesaw State	0

Regional Finals
7	**LSU**	0	**8**
Louisiana	**2**	5
10	**Florida State**	**2**	—
UCF	0	—

Super Regionals
7	LSU	0	3	—
10	**Florida State**	**1**	**4**^{(9)}	—

=== Los Angeles Super Regional ===
Round 1	Round 2
2	**UCLA**	**8**^{(5)}
Long Beach State	0
2	**UCLA**	**5**^{(8)}
Fresno State	4
**Fresno State**	**3**
Minnesota	0
Los Angeles Regional – Easton Stadium
**Minnesota**	**11**
Long Beach State	0
Fresno State	3
**Minnesota**	**6**
15	**Arizona State**	**7**
Southern Illinois	4
15	Arizona State	2
**Virginia Tech**	**8**
BYU	2
**Virginia Tech**	**5**
Tempe Regional – Alberta B. Farrington Softball Stadium
Southern Illinois	2
**BYU**	**7**
15	Arizona State	8
**BYU**	**9**

Regional Finals
2	**UCLA**	**2**	—
Minnesota	1	—
**Virginia Tech**	**11**^{(5)}	—
BYU	3	—

Super Regionals
2	**UCLA**	2	**2**	**6**
Virginia Tech	**7**	0	0

== Women's College World Series ==
The Women's College World Series was held June 3 through June 10 in Oklahoma City.

=== Participants ===
School	Conference	Record (conference)	Head coach	WCWS appearances† (including 2021 WCWS)	WCWS best finish†*	WCWS W–L record† (excluding 2021 WCWS)
Alabama	SEC	50–7 (18–6)	Patrick Murphy	13 (last: 2019)	1st (2012)	20–23
Arizona	Pac-12	41–13 (12–10)	Mike Candrea	24 (last: 2019)	1st (1991, 1993, 1994, 1996; 1997, 2001, 2006, 2007)	62–34
Florida State	ACC	44-10-1 (26–5-1)	Lonni Alameda	11 (last: 2018)	1st (2018)	13–18
Georgia	SEC	34–21 (7–17)	Lu Harris-Champer	5 (last: 2018)	3rd (2009, 2010)	5–8
James Madison	CAA	39–2 (17–1)	Loren LaPorte	1	—	—
Oklahoma	Big 12	50–2 (16–1)	Patty Gasso	14 (last: 2019)	1st (2000, 2013, 2016, 2017)	32–20
Oklahoma State	Big 12	47–10 (15–3)	Kenny Gajewski	9 (last: 2019)	3rd (1989, 1990, 1993, 1994)	12–16
UCLA	Pac-12	46–5 (19–2)	Kelly Inouye-Perez	30 (last: 2019)	1st (1982, 1984, 1985, 1988, 1989, 1990, 1992, 1999, 2003, 2004, 2010, 2019)	103–36

† = From NCAA Division I Softball Championship Results

=== Bracket ===
First round
1	Oklahoma	3
**James Madison**	**4**^{(8)}
5	**Oklahoma State**	**3**
Georgia	2
1	**Oklahoma**	**8**^{(6)}
Georgia	0
3	**Alabama**	**5**
11	Arizona	1
10	Florida State	0
2	**UCLA**	**4**
11	Arizona	3
10	**Florida State**	**4**

Second round
**James Madison**	**2**
5	Oklahoma State	1
2	UCLA	3
1	**Oklahoma**	**10**
3	**Alabama**	**6**
2	UCLA	0
5	Oklahoma State	2
10	**Florida State**	**4**

Semifinals
James Madison	3	1
1	**Oklahoma**	**6**	**7**
3	Alabama	0	5
10	**Florida State**	**2**	**8**

Finals
1	**Oklahoma**	4	**6**	**5**
10	Florida State	**8**	2	1

=== Game results ===
Date	Game	Winning team	Score	Losing team	Winning pitcher	Losing pitcher	Save	Notes
June 3	Game 1	James Madison	4–3 ^{(8)}	Oklahoma	Odicci Alexander (17–1)	Shannon Saile (17–1)	–	–
June 3	Game 2	Oklahoma State	3–2	Georgia	Carrie Eberle (26–3)	Mary Wilson Avant (20–11)	–	–
June 3	Game 3	Alabama	5–1	Arizona	Montana Fouts (26–3)	Hanah Bowen (11–3)	–	–
June 3	Game 4	UCLA	4–0	Florida State	Rachel Garcia (18–1)	Kathryn Sandercock (24–3)	–	–
June 4	Game 5	James Madison	2–1	Oklahoma State	Odicci Alexander (18–1)	Carrie Eberle (26–4)	–	JMU: First unseeded team in WCWS history to advance to the semifinals
June 4	Game 6	Alabama	6–0	UCLA	Montana Fouts (27–3)	Rachel Garcia (18–2)	–	Montana Fouts perfect game; sixth in WCWS history
June 5	Game 7	Oklahoma	8–0 ^{(6)}	Georgia	Giselle Juarez (19–1)	Mary Wilson Avant (20–12)	–	Georgia eliminated
June 5	Game 8	Florida State	4–3	Arizona	Kathryn Sandercock (25–3)	Mariah Lopez (9–3)	–	Arizona eliminated
June 5	Game 9	Oklahoma	10–3	UCLA	Giselle Juarez (20–1)	Rachel Garcia (18–3)	–	UCLA eliminated
June 5	Game 10	Florida State	4–2	Oklahoma State	Kathryn Sandercock (26–3)	Kelly Maxwell (15–5)	–	Oklahoma State eliminated
June 6	Game 11	Oklahoma	6–3	James Madison	Nicole May (15–1)	Odicci Alexander (18–2)	–	–
June 6	Game 12	Florida State	2–0	Alabama	Kathryn Sandercock (27–3)	Lexi Kilfoyl (14–3)	–	–
June 7	Game 13	Oklahoma	7–1	James Madison	Giselle Juarez (21–1)	Odicci Alexander (18–3)	–	James Madison eliminated
June 7	Game 14	Florida State	8–5	Alabama	Danielle Watson (11–1)	Montana Fouts (27–4)	–	Alabama eliminated
Finals
June 8	Game 1	Florida State	8–4	Oklahoma	Danielle Watson (12–1)	Nicole May (15–2)	–	Florida State 1–0
June 9	Game 2	Oklahoma	6–2	Florida State	Giselle Juarez (22–1)	Kathryn Sandercock (27–4)	–	Tied 1–1
June 10	Game 3	Oklahoma	5–1	Florida State	Giselle Juarez (23–1)	Danielle Watson (12–2)	–	Oklahoma wins WCWS

=== Finals ===
June 8, 2021 – 6:30 p.m. (CDT) at USA Softball Hall of Fame Stadium in Oklahoma City, Oklahoma
Team	1	2	3	4	5	6	7	R	H	E
**Florida State**	0	0	2	5	0	0	1	**8**	**11**	**2**
Oklahoma	0	0	0	2	0	2	0	**4**	**8**	**3**
WP: Danielle Watson (12–1) LP: Nicole May (15–2) Sv: Kathryn Sandercock (2); Home runs: FSU: Kalei Harding; OKLA: Kinzie Hansen, Nicole Mendes; Attendance: 12,173; Boxscore

June 9, 2021 – 6:00 p.m. (CDT) at USA Softball Hall of Fame Stadium in Oklahoma City, Oklahoma
Team	1	2	3	4	5	6	7	R	H	E
**Oklahoma**	0	0	1	0	0	4	1	**6**	**11**	**0**
Florida State	2	0	0	0	0	0	0	**2**	**4**	**1**
WP: Giselle Juarez (22–1) LP: Kathryn Sandercock (27–4); Home runs: OKLA: Jocelyn Alo, Jana Johns; FSU: Elizabeth Mason; Attendance: 12,115; Boxscore

June 10, 2021 – 2:00 p.m. (CDT) at USA Softball Hall of Fame Stadium in Oklahoma City, Oklahoma
Team	1	2	3	4	5	6	7	R	H	E
Florida State	0	0	1	0	0	0	0	**1**	**2**	**0**
**Oklahoma**	1	1	3	0	0	0	x	**5**	**5**	**0**
WP: Giselle Juarez (23–1) LP: Danielle Watson (12–2); Home runs: FSU: None; OKLA: Jocelyn Alo, Jayda Coleman; Attendance: 10,830; Boxscore

=== All-tournament Team ===
The following players were members of the Women's College World Series All-Tournament Team.

Position	Player	School
P	**Giselle Juarez (MOP)**	Oklahoma
P	Odicci Alexander	James Madison
P	Montana Fouts	Alabama
P	Kathryn Sandercock	Florida State
2B	Tiare Jennings	Oklahoma
OF	Mackenzie Donihoo	Oklahoma
OF	Kate Gordon	James Madison
OF	Nicole Mendes	Oklahoma
OF	Kaley Mudge	Florida State
C	Kinzie Hansen	Oklahoma
U	Jocelyn Alo	Oklahoma
U	Bailey Hemphill	Alabama

== Record by conference ==
Conference	# of Bids	Record	Win %	RF	SR	WS	NS	F	NC
Big 12	5	23–12	.657	4	3	2	1	1	1
ACC	5	19–11	.633	5	2	1	1	1	–
SEC	12	35–25	.583	9	7	2	1	–	–
CAA	1	7–3	.700	1	1	1	1	–	–
Pac-12	6	21–14	.600	5	3	2	–	–	–
American	3	6–6	.500	3	–	–	–	–	–
Big Ten	3	5–6	.455	2	–	–	–	–	–
ASUN	2	3–4	.429	1	–	–	–	–	–
Sun Belt	4	6–8	.429	1	–	–	–	–	–
WCC	1	2–2	.500	1	–	–	–	–	–
Other	22	8–44	.154	–	–	–	–	–	–

The columns RF, SR, WS, NS, F, and NC respectively stand for the Regional Finals, Super Regionals, College World Series Teams, National Semi-Finals, Finals, and National Champion.

== Media coverage ==
=== Radio ===
For the first time ever Westwood One will provide nationwide radio coverage of every game in the Women's College World Series. It was streamed online at westwoodsports.com, through TuneIn, and on SiriusXM. Ryan Radtke and Leah Amico return as the broadcast team.

=== Television ===
ESPN held exclusive rights to the tournament. The network aired games across ESPN, ESPN2, ESPNU, SEC Network, Longhorn Network, ACC Network and ESPN3. For just the fourth time in the history of the women's softball tournament, ESPN covered every regional. ABC will air a super regional game for the first time in tournament history.

==== Broadcast assignments ====
Regionals

- Norman: Courtney Lyle & Kayla Braud
- Los Angeles: Mark Neely & Kenzie Fowler
- Tuscaloosa: Eric Frede & Madison Shipman
- Gainesville: Beth Mowins & Michele Smith
- Stillwater: Clay Matvick & Natasha Watley
- Fayetteville: Mike Corey & Leah Amico
- Baton Rouge: Alex Loeb & Megan Willis
- Columbia: Tyler Denning & Tori Vidales

Super Regionals

- Norman: Beth Mowins, Jessica Mendoza, Michele Smith & Holly Rowe
- Columbia: Mike Couzens & Carol Bruggeman
- Stillwater: Tiffany Greene & Erin Miller
- Gainesville: Courtney Lyle & Kayla Braud

Women's College World Series

- Kevin Brown, Amanda Scarborough & Jalyn Johnson (afternoons, early Fri)
- Beth Mowins, Jessica Mendoza, Michele Smith & Holly Rowe (evenings minus early Fri)

Regionals

- Knoxville: Tiffany Greene & Erin Miller
- Tallahassee: Jenn Hildreth & Brittany McKinney
- Tucson: Jonathan Yardley & Amanda Freed
- Austin: Kevin Brown, Amanda Scarborough & Jalyn Johnson
- Athens: Alex Perlman & Francesca Enea
- Lexington: Mike Couzens & Carol Bruggeman
- Tempe: John Schriffen & Jennie Ritter
- Seattle: Pam Ward & Jenny Dalton-Hill

Super Regionals

- Tuscaloosa: Eric Frede & Madison Shipman
- Fayetteville: Pam Ward & Jenny Dalton Hill
- Baton Rouge: Kevin Brown, Amanda Scarborough & Jalyn Johnson
- Los Angeles: Mark Neely & Kenzie Fowler

Women's College World Series Finals

- Beth Mowins, Jessica Mendoza, Michele Smith & Holly Rowe
