= 2014 Houston Cougars softball team =

American college softball season

2014 Houston Cougars softball

Waco Regional, 1–2
- Conference: American Athletic Conference
- Record: 33–23 (13–8 AAC)
- Head coach: Kyla Holas (14th season)
- Assistant coaches: Kristin Vesely (4th season); Chrissy Schoonmaker (1st season)
- Home stadium: Cougar Softball Stadium

2014 American Athletic Conference softball standings
	Conf.				Overall
Team	W		L	PCT	W		L	PCT
UCF ‍†‍‍^{y}	15	–	3	.833	43	–	18	.705
South Florida ‍‍‍^{y}	13	–	5	.722	43	–	17	.717
Louisville ‍‍‡‍^{y}	14	–	7	.667	36	–	22	.621
Houston ‍‍‍^{y}	13	–	8	.619	33	–	23	.589
Rutgers ‍‍‍	9	–	9	.500	28	–	19	.596
Temple ‍‍‍	5	–	13	.278	15	–	30	.333
Memphis ‍‍‍	5	–	15	.250	23	–	33	.411
UConn ‍‍‍	3	–	17	.150	13	–	38	.255
† – Conference champion ‡ – Tournament champion y – Invited to the NCAA tournament As of May 18, 2014; Rankings from USA Today/NFCA Coaches

The 2014 Houston Cougars softball team represented the University of Houston in the 2014 NCAA Division I softball season. Kyla Holas entered her 14th season as head coach of the Cougars. The Cougars were picked to finish 3rd in the AAC. The Cougars would finish fourth in the conference standings and be upset in the 1st Round of the AAC Tournament. However the Cougars would receive an at-large bid to the 2014 NCAA Tournament. After going 1–2 in the Waco Regional, the Cougars ended the season 33–23.

== 2014 Roster ==
2014 Houston Cougars Roster
Pitchers: 1 Diedre Outon – senior; 8 Julana Shrum – sophomore; 33 Summer Groholski – junior; Catchers: 4 Kris Davilla – junior; 10 Haley Outon – senior; Utility: 7 Selena Hernandez - Sophomore	Infielders: 3 Jaime Edwards – junior; 4 Kris Davilla – junior; 15 Kayla Holland – junior; 20 Hayley Chamberlain – freshman; 22 Jordan Rains – freshman; 34 Alexis Dunn – junior	Outfielders: 1 Diedre Outon – senior; 5 Sydney Gerbracht - RS Junior; 8 Julana Shrum – sophomore; 9 Tiffani McKnight – junior; 13 Kendra Cullum – senior; 15 Kayla Holland – junior; 26 Katie St. Pierre – sophomore

== Schedule ==
Date	Time	Opponent	Site	Result	Attendance	Winning Pitcher	Losing Pitcher
Houston Hilton Plaza Classic
February 14*	2:00 PM	Sam Houston State Bearkats	Cougar Softball Stadium • Houston, TX	W 11–5	619	Summer Groholski (1-0)	Shelby Lancaster
February 14*	4:30 PM	Nebraska Cornhuskers	Cougar Softball Stadium • Houston, TX	L 1–4	619	Tat Edwards	Julana Shrum (0-1)
February 15*	4:30 PM	Army Black Knights	Cougar Softball Stadium • Houston, TX	W 6–0	1,265	Diedre Outon (1-0)	Smith
February 15*	7:00 PM	Sam Houston State Bearkats	Cougar Softball Stadium • Houston, TX	W 13–5	1,265	Julana Shrum (1-1)	Meme Quinn
February 16*	11:30 AM	Army Black Knights	Cougar Softball Stadium • Houston, TX	W 6–2	888	Diedre Outon (2-0)	Roy
February 16*	2:00 PM	Stephen F. Austin Ladyjacks	Cougar Softball Stadium • Houston, TX	W 7–3	888	Summer Groholski (2-0)	Brittany Lewis
Houston Hilton Plaza Invitational
February 21*	4:30 PM	Nicholls State Colonels	Cougar Softball Stadium • Houston, TX	W 15–1^{6}	555	Summer Groholski (3-0)	Hannah Haydel
February 21*	7:00 PM	Columbia Lions	Cougar Softball Stadium • Houston, TX	W 17-0^{5}	555	Diedre Outon (3-0)	Kayla Maloney
February 22*	4:30 PM	Columbia Lions	Cougar Softball Stadium • Houston, TX	W 5–4	555	Julana Shrum (2-1)	Brooke Darling
February 22*	7:00 PM	North Dakota State Bison	Cougar Softball Stadium • Houston, TX	L 1–3	723	Krista Menke	Diedre Outon (3-1)
February 23*	12:30 PM	Nicholls State Colonels	Cougar Softball Stadium • Houston, TX	W 12–4^{5}	312	Diedre Outon (4-1)	Taylor Hastings
Easton Crimson Classic
February 28*	11:00 AM	#9 Florida State Seminoles	Rhoads Stadium • Tuscaloosa, AL	L 1–7	2,268	Lacey Waldrop	Diedre Outon (4-2)
February 28*	6:00 PM	#10 Alabama Crimson Tide	Rhoads Stadium • Tuscaloosa, AL	L 4–11	2,268	Jaclyn Traina	Summer Groholski (3-1)
March 1*	4:00 PM	#10 Alabama Crimson Tide	Rhoads Stadium • Tuscaloosa, AL	L 1–12^{5}	2,988	Leslie Jury	Julana Shrum (2-2)
March 1*	6:00 PM	Purdue Boilermakers	Rhoads Stadium • Tuscaloosa, AL	W 4–2	2,988	Summer Groholski (4-1)	Lilly Fecho
March 2*	11:00 AM	Purdue Boilermakers	Rhoads Stadium • Tuscaloosa, AL	L 2–5	N/A	Lilly Fecho	Diedre Outon (4-3)
Regular Season
March 3*	6:00 PM	North Texas Mean Green	Cougar Softball Stadium • Houston, TX	L 1–6	263	Ashley Kirk	Summer Groholski (4-2)
Judi Garman Classic
March 6*	7:30 PM	Texas	Anderson Family Field • Fullerton, CA	L 1–5	600	Tiarra Davis	Julana Shrum (2-3)
March 7*	12:00 PM	Long Beach State 49ers	Anderson Family Field • Fullerton, CA	L 5–7	1,000	Amanda Hansen	Diedre Outon (4-4)
March 7*	2:30 PM	Michigan Wolverines	Anderson Family Field • Fullerton, CA	W 5–2	1,000	Diedre Outon (5-4)	Megan Betsa
March 8*	7:30 PM	Fresno State Bulldogs	Anderson Family Field • Fullerton, CA	W 4–2	1,200	Julana Shrum (3-3)	Hannah Harris
March 8*	10:00 PM	Arizona Wildcats	Anderson Family Field • Fullerton, CA	L 5–6^{9}	1,818	Estela Pinon	Diedre Outon (5-5)
Regular Season
March 19*	7:00 PM	Texas Longhorns	Red & Charline McCombs Field • Austin, TX	W 5–4	802	Julana Shrum (4-3)	Lauren Slatten
March 22	1:00 PM	Temple Owls	Cougar Softball Stadium • Houston, TX	W 8–0^{5}	412	Diedre Outon (6-5)	Amanda Gatt
March 22	3:00 PM	Temple Owls	Cougar Softball Stadium • Houston, TX	W 8–0^{5}	412	Julana Shrum (5-3)	Kelsey Dominik
March 23	11:00 AM	Temple Owls	Cougar Softball Stadium • Houston, TX	W 7–6	512	Diedre Outon (7-5)	Jessica Mahoney
March 29	1:00 PM	Louisville Cardinals	Cougar Softball Stadium • Houston, TX	W 6–5	692	Diedre Outon (8-5)	Maryssa Becker
March 29	3:00 PM	Louisville Cardinals	Cougar Softball Stadium • Houston, TX	W 4–0	692	Julana Shrum (6-3)	Caralisa Connell
March 30	12:00 PM	Louisville Cardinals	Cougar Softball Stadium • Houston, TX	W 8–5	713	Diedre Outon (9-5)	Rachel Lo Coq
April 2*	6:30 PM	#18 Texas A&M Aggies	Cougar Softball Stadium • Houston, TX	W 2–1	1,400	Julana Shrum (7-3)	Katie Marks
April 5	11:00 AM	Connecticut Huskies	Burrill Family Field • Storrs, CT	W 12–2^{5}	83	Julana Shrum (8-3)	Duggan
April 5	1:00 PM	Connecticut Huskies	Burrill Family Field • Storrs, CT	W 16–2^{5}	83	Diedre Outon (10-5)	Callahan
April 6	10:00 AM	Connecticut Huskies	Burrill Family Field • Storrs, CT	W 8–4	87	Diedre Outon (11-5)	Duggan
April 8*	4:00 PM	#12 Baylor Lady Bears	Cougar Softball Stadium • Houston, TX	L 0–3	969	Whitney Canion	Julana Shrum (8-4)
April 8*	6:00 PM	#12 Baylor Lady Bears	Cougar Softball Stadium • Houston, TX	W 3–2	939	Julana Shrum (9-4)	Heather Stearns
April 12	1:00 PM	Memphis Tigers	Tiger Softball Stadium • Memphis, TN	W 12–5^{11}	249	Diedre Outon (12-5)	Ellen Roberts
April 12	4:30 PM	Memphis Tigers	Tiger Softball Stadium • Memphis, TN	W 9–0	249	Summer Groholski (5-2)	Jordan Richwood
April 13	11:00 AM	Memphis Tigers	Tiger Softball Stadium • Memphis, TN	L 5–6	223	Christian Novak	Summer Groholski (5-3)
April 16*	3:00 PM	Lamar Lady Cardinals	Ford Park • Beaumont, TX	W 5–2	344	Diedre Outon (13-5)	Tina Schulz
April 16*	6:00 PM	Lamar Lady Cardinals	Ford Park • Beaumont, TX	W 7–1	344	Julana Shrum (10-4)	Lauren Dannelley
April 18	1:00 PM	USF Bulls	Cougar Softball Stadium • Houston, TX	L 5–6	479	Sara Nevins	Diedre Outon (13-6)
April 18	3:00 PM	USF Bulls	Cougar Softball Stadium • Houston, TX	L 2–4	479	Sara Nevins	Summer Groholski (5-4)
April 19	12:00 PM	USF Bulls	Cougar Softball Stadium • Houston, TX	L 2–5	612	Sara Nevins	Julana Shrum (10-5)
April 23*	5:00 PM	Houston Baptist Huskies	Cougar Softball Stadium • Houston, TX	W 2–1	765	Diedre Outon (14-6)	Emily Mueller
April 23*	7:00 PM	Houston Baptist Huskies	Cougar Softball Stadium • Houston, TX	L 5–6	765	Kendall Stiefel	Diedre Outon (14-7)
April 26	12:00 PM	UCF Knights	UCF Softball Complex • Orlando, FL	L 1–7	320	Shelby Turnier	Diedre Outon (14-8)
April 26	2:00 PM	UCF Knights	UCF Softball Complex • Orlando, FL	L 2–7	320	Mackenzie Audas	Julana Shrum (10-6)
April 27	11:00 AM	UCF Knights	UCF Softball Complex • Orlando, FL	L 5–7	377	Mackenzie Audas	Summer Groholski (5-5)
April 30*	3:00 PM	Texas A&M-Corpus Christi Islanders	Chapman Stadium • Corpus Christi, TX	W 9–4	177	Summer Groholski (6-5)	Constan Brandenburg
May 3	1:00 PM	Rutgers Scarlet Knights	Cougar Softball Stadium • Houston, TX	L 0–1^{10}	752	Alyssa Landrith	Diedre Outon (14-9)
May 3	4:00 PM	Rutgers Scarlet Knights	Cougar Softball Stadium • Houston, TX	W 7–2	752	Summer Groholski (7-5)	Shayla Sweeney
May 4	12:00 PM	Rutgers Scarlet Knights	Cougar Softball Stadium • Houston, TX	W 4–2	627	Diedre Outon (15-9)	Shayla Sweeney
2014 AAC Tournament
May 8	6:00 PM	Rutgers Scarlet Knights	Cougar Softball Stadium • Houston, TX	L 1–5	835	Alyssa Landrith	Julana Shrum (10-7)
2014 NCAA Regionals
May 16*	4:30 PM	Tulsa Golden Hurricane	Getterman Stadium • Waco, TX	L 1–2	818	Aimee Creger	Diedre Outon (15-10)
May 17*	2:30 PM	Northwestern State Lady Demons	Getterman Stadium • Waco, TX	W 7–6	890	Summer Groholski (8-5)	Kaylee Guidry
May 17*	5:50 PM	Tulsa Golden Hurricane	Getterman Stadium • Waco, TX	L 6–10	906	Caitlin Sill	Deidre Outon (15-11)
*Non-Conference Game. All times are in Central Time Zone.
