= 2021 Texas Longhorns softball team =

American college softball season

2021 Texas Longhorns softball

NCAA Austin Regional Champion
- Conference: Big 12 Conference

Ranking
- Coaches: No. 12
- Record: 43-14 (12-6 Big 12)
- Head coach: Mike White (3rd season)
- Assistant coaches: Steve Singleton (2nd season); Megan Bartlett (1st season); Courtney Gettins (1st season)
- Home stadium: Red and Charline McCombs Field

2021 Big 12 Conference softball standings
	Conf.				Overall
Team	W		L	PCT	W		L	PCT
No. 1 Oklahoma ‍†‍‡‍^{y}	16	–	1	.941	56	–	4	.933
No. 7 Oklahoma State ‍‍‍^{y}	15	–	3	.833	48	–	12	.800
No. 11 Texas ‍‍‍^{y}	12	–	6	.667	43	–	14	.754
Baylor ‍‍‍^{y}	8	–	9	.471	27	–	23	.540
Iowa State ‍‍‍^{y}	6	–	12	.333	34	–	23	.596
Texas Tech ‍‍‍	3	–	15	.167	21	–	26	.447
Kansas ‍‍‍	2	–	16	.111	22	–	26	.458
† – Conference champion ‡ – Tournament champion y – Invited to the NCAA tournament As of June 10, 2021; Rankings from NFCA/USA Today

The 2021 Texas Longhorns softball team represented the University of Texas at Austin during the 2021 NCAA Division I softball season. The Longhorns played their home games at Red and Charline McCombs Field as a member of the Big 12 Conference. They were led by head coach Mike White, in his third season at Texas.

== Personnel ==
=== Roster ===
2021 Texas Longhorns Roster
Pitchers: 7 – Molly Jacobsen - Graduate Student; 14 – Ryleigh White – freshman; 15 – Courtney Day – freshman; 21 – Ariana Adams – junior; 29 – Shealyn O’Leary – sophomore	Catchers: 17 – Taylor Ellsworth - (redshirt) Junior; 18 – Jayden Smith – freshman; 19 – Colleen Sullivan – sophomore; 27 – London Marder – freshman; 33 – Mary Iakopo – junior; Infielders/Utility Players: 00 – Lauren Burke – junior; 2 – Janae Jefferson – junior; 4 – Brianna Cantu – freshman; 5 – Jordyn Whitaker – freshman; 9 – McKenzie Parker – sophomore; 10 – Cassie Roche – senior; 11 – Alyssa Washington – freshman; 12 – Bailey Williams – freshman; 16 – Alyssa Popelka – freshman; 20 – Carlee Ratcliff – freshman; 22 – MK Tetter – junior; 25 – Kaitlyn Washington – senior; 28 – Camille Corona – freshman	Outfielders: 13 – Shannon Rhodes – senior

== Schedule and results ==
Legend
	Texas win
	Texas loss
	Postponement
**Bold**	Texas team member

2021 Texas Longhorns Softball Game Log
Regular season (38-9)

February (8-0)
Date	Opponent	Rank	Site/stadium	Score	Win	Loss	Save	Attendance	Overall record	Big 12 Record
Scrap Yard Blizzard Challenge
Feb 21	Wichita State	#7	Scrap Yard Complex • Conroe, TX	8-0 (5)	O’Leary (1-0)	McDonald (1-1)		476	1-0	–
Feb 21	North Texas	#7	Scrap Yard Complex • Conroe, TX	5-1	Jacobsen (1-0)	Trautwein (2-1)		597	2-0	–
Feb 24	Texas State	#7	Red and Charline McCombs Field• Austin, TX	1-0 (8)	Jacobsen (2-0)	Mullins (1-1)		282	3-0	–
Lone Star State Invitational
Feb 26	Sam Houston State	#7	Red and Charline McCombs Field• Austin, TX	9-3	White (1-0)	Bachmeyer (0-2)	**Day (1)**	0	4-0	–
Feb 26	Lamar*	#7	Red and Charline McCombs Field• Austin, TX	10-0 (5)	Adams (1-0)	Reyna (0-5)		0	5-0	–
Feb 27	#25 Mississippi State*	#7	Red and Charline McCombs Field• Austin, TX	8-7	O’Leary (2-0)	Loza (1-2)	**Jacobsen (1)**	0	6-0	–
Feb 28	UConn*	#7	Red and Charline McCombs Field• Austin, TX	16-2 (5)	White (2-0)	Kinney (3-3)		0	7-0	–
Feb 28	Ole Miss*	#7	Red and Charline McCombs Field• Austin, TX	5-2	Jacobsen (3-0)	Diederich (3-5)		0	8-0	–

March (16-3)
Date	Opponent	Rank	Site/stadium	Score	Win	Loss	Save	Attendance	Overall record	Big 12 Record
Mar 3	at Houston*	#7	Cougar Softball Stadium• Houston, TX	9-0 (5)	**White (3-0)**	Hudson (3-2)		99	9-0	–
Mar 5	at #13 LSU*	#7	Tiger Park• Baton Rouge, LA	8-5	**Jacobsen (4-0)**	Wickersham (3-1)		519	10-0	–
Mar 6	at #13 LSU*	#7	Tiger Park• Baton Rouge, LA	1-2 (8)	Sunseri (4-2)	**Jacobsen (4-1)**		679	10-1	–
Mar 6	at #13 LSU*	#7	Tiger Park• Baton Rouge, LA	2-7	Kilponen (2-2)	**White (3-1)**		801	10-2	–
Mar 10	Texas A&M–Corpus Christi	#10	Red and Charline McCombs Field • Austin, TX	10-6	**Day (1-0)**	McNeill (1-2)	**Adams (1)**	310	11-2	–
Mar 12	Tarleton State	#10	Red and Charline McCombs Field • Austin, TX	9-1 (6)	**Adams (2-0)**	Bridges (2-6)			12-2	–
Mar 12	Texas Southern	#10	Red and Charline McCombs Field • Austin, TX	11-2 (5)	**Adams (3-0)**	Gendorf (1-5)			13-2	–
Mar 13	Tarleton State	#10	Red and Charline McCombs Field • Austin, TX	21-5 (5)	**White (4-1)**	Wernet (6-5)			14-2	–
Mar 13	BYU	#10	Red and Charline McCombs Field • Austin, TX	10-7	**Jacobsen (5-1)**	Moffat-Korth (5-7)			15-2	–
Mar 16	at McNeese State	#10	Joe Miller Field at Cowgirl Diamond• Lake Charles, LA	5-2	**Jacobsen (6-1)**	Tate (3-6)		379	16-2	–
Mar 18	#15 Louisiana	#10	Red and Charline McCombs Field• Austin, TX	4-0	**O’Leary (3-0)**	Lamb (5-2)			17-2	–
Mar 18	#15 Louisiana	#10	Red and Charline McCombs Field• Austin, TX	9-10	Ellyson (5-3)	**Jacobsen (6-2)**			17-3	–
Mar 19	New Mexico	#10	Red and Charline McCombs Field • Austin, TX	5-3	**Day (2-0)**	Guindon (1-11)	**O’Leary (1)**	404	18-3	–
Mar 20	New Mexico	#10	Red and Charline McCombs Field • Austin, TX	12-0 (5)	**Adams (4-0)**	Roberts (0-2)			19-3	–
Mar 20	New Mexico	#10	Red and Charline McCombs Field • Austin, TX	8-1	**Jacobsen (7-2)**	Guindon (1-12)	**O’Leary (2)**		20-3	–
Bevo Classic
Mar 26	South Dakota	#8	Red and Charline McCombs Field • Austin, TX	6-5	**O’Leary (4-0)**	Maher (1-4)		335	21-3	–
Mar 27	UT Arlington	#8	Red and Charline McCombs Field • Austin, TX	2-1	**O’Leary (5-0)**	Valencia (0-2)		413	22-3	–
Mar 27	UTSA	#8	Red and Charline McCombs Field • Austin, TX	8-0 (5)	**Jacobsen (8-2)**	Carpenter (0-2)		413	23-3	–
Mar 28	UT Arlington	#8	Red and Charline McCombs Field • Austin, TX	9-1 (6)	**Jacobsen (9-2)**	Hines (2-9)		434	24-3	–

April (12-4)
Date	Opponent	Rank	Site/stadium	Score	Win	Loss	Save	Attendance	Overall record	Big 12 Record
Apr 1	Texas Tech	#7	Red and Charline McCombs Field • Austin, TX	5-0	**O’Leary (6-0)**	Zoch (7-6)		396	25-3	1-0
Apr 2	Texas Tech	#7	Red and Charline McCombs Field • Austin, TX	10-1 (5)	**Jacobsen (10-2)**	Edmoundson (7-6)		557	26-3	2-0
Apr 3	Texas Tech	#7	Red and Charline McCombs Field • Austin, TX	2-1	**O’Leary (7-0)**	Zoch (7-7)		485	27-3	3-0
Apr 7	at UT Arlington	#7	Allan Saxe Field• Arlington, TX	12-0	**Jacobsen (11-2)**	Henriksen (1-3)		156	28-3	–
Apr 9	at Iowa State	#7	Cyclone Sports Complex • Ames, IA	8-5	**O’Leary (8-0)**	Charles (10-6)		237	29-3	4-0
Apr 10	at Iowa State	#7	Cyclone Sports Complex • Ames, IA	11-5	**Jacobsen (12-2)**	Spelhaug			30-3	5-0
Apr 11	at Iowa State	#7	Cyclone Sports Complex • Ames, IA	10-0 (6)	**O’Leary (9-0)**	Jasso (1-2)		221	31-3	6-0
Apr 16	at Oklahoma	#7	OU Softball Complex • Norman, OK	1-11 (5)	Juarez (12-0)	**O’Leary (9-1)**		459	31-4	6-1
Apr 17	at Oklahoma	#7	OU Softball Complex • Norman, OK	2-10 (5)	Saile (9-0)	**Jacobsen (12-3)**		484	31-5	6-2
Apr 16	at Oklahoma	#7	OU Softball Complex • Norman, OK	0-9 (5)	May (11-0)	**O’Leary (9-2)**		497	31-6	6-3
Apr 21	Texas State	#9	Red and Charline McCombs Field • Austin, TX	5–4	**Day (3–0)**	Mullins (14–6)	O'Leary (3)	375	32–6	–
Apr 23	Kansas	#9	Red and Charline McCombs Field • Austin, TX	8–1	**White (5–1)**	Hamilton (5–8)			33–6	7–3
Apr 24	Kansas	#9	Red and Charline McCombs Field • Austin, TX	10–1 (5)	**O'Leary (10–2)**	Reed (7–4)		497	34–6	8–3
Apr 25	Kansas	#9	Red and Charline McCombs Field • Austin, TX	10–8	**Day (4–0)**	Reed (7–5)		496	35–6	9–3
Apr 30	#11 Oklahoma State	#7	Red and Charline McCombs Field • Austin, TX	1–3	Eberle (17–1)	**O'Leary (10–3)**		385	35–7	9–4

May (3–2)
Date	Opponent	Rank	Site/stadium	Score	Win	Loss	Save	Attendance	Overall record	Big 12 Record
May 1	#11 Oklahoma State	#7	Red and Charline McCombs Field • Austin, TX	1–5	Maxwell (14–2)	**Day (4–1)**		510	35–8	9–5
May 2	#11 Oklahoma State	#7	Red and Charline McCombs Field • Austin, TX	4–6	Eberle (18–1)	**Jacobsen (12–4)**	Maxwell (3)	507	35–9	9–6
May 7	Baylor	#11	Red and Charline McCombs Field • Austin, TX	8–0 (6)	**O'Leary (11–3)**	Rodoni (11–8)		562	36–9	10–6
May 8	at Baylor	#11	Getterman Stadium • Waco, TX	6–0	**Jacobsen (13–4)**	Mansell (8–5)		600	37–9	11–6
May 9	at Baylor	#11	Getterman Stadium • Waco, TX	5–0	**O'Leary (12–3)**	Rodoni (11–9)		600	28–9	12–6

Postseason (5-5)

Big 12 softball tournament (1-2)
Date	Opponent	Seed	Site/stadium	Score	Win	Loss	Save	Attendance	Overall record	Tournament record
May 14	vs. #2 Oklahoma State	#3	ASA Hall of Fame Stadium • Oklahoma City, OK	2–3 (9)	Eberle (20–2)	O'Leary (12–4)			38–10	0–1
May 14	vs. #5 Iowa State	#3	ASA Hall of Fame Stadium • Oklahoma City, OK	7–4	O'Leary (13–4)	Mortimer (5–1)			39–10	1–1
May 15	vs. #6 Texas Tech	#3	ASA Hall of Fame Stadium • Oklahoma City, OK	1–5	Zoch (12–12)	Jacobsen (13–5)			39–11	1–2

NCAA Austin Regional (3-1)
Date	Opponent	Rank	Site/stadium	Score	Win	Loss	Save	Attendance	Overall record	Regional Record
May 21	St. Francis	#12	Red and Charline McCombs Field • Austin, TX	12–0 (5)	**O'Leary (14–4)**	Vesco (22–4)		822	40–11	1–0
May 22	Texas State	#12	Red and Charline McCombs Field • Austin, TX	6–0	**O'Leary (15–4)**	Kind (12–5)		973	41–11	2–0
May 23	Oregon	#12	Red and Charline McCombs Field • Austin, TX	2–3 (8)	Yanez (22–6)	**O'Leary (15–5)**		1,056	41–12	2–1
May 23	Oregon	#12	Red and Charline McCombs Field • Austin, TX	1–0	**Jacobsen (14–5)**	Diaz (5–3)		1,056	42–12	3–1

NCAA Stillwater Super Regional (1-2)
Date	Opponent	Rank	Site/stadium	Score	Win	Loss	Save	Attendance	Overall record	Super Regional Record
May 28	at #7 Oklahoma State	#11	Cowgirl Stadium • Stillwater, OK	1–6	Eberle (24–3)	**Jacobsen (14–6)**		713	42–13	0–1
May 29	vs. #7 Oklahoma State	#11	Cowgirl Stadium • Stillwater, OK	4–2	**O'Leary (16–5)**	Maxwell (15–4)		833	43–13	1–1
May 30	at #7 Oklahoma State	#11	Cowgirl Stadium • Stillwater, OK	0–2	Eberle (25–3)	**O'Leary (16–6)**		694	43–14	1–2

=== Coaches ===
**2021 Texas Longhorns coaching staff**
- Mike White – Head coach – 3rd year
- Steve Singleton – Assistant coach – 2nd year
- Megan Bartlett – Assistant coach – 1st year
- Courtney Gettins – Volunteer assistant coach – 1st year

== Player stats ==
=== Batting ===
Note: No. = Number; G = Games played; AB = At bats; H = Hits; Avg. = Batting average; HR = Home runs; RBI = Runs batted in

Note: Gold Highlight = Team Leader(s)

Note: Leaders must meet the minimum requirement of 2 PA/G and 75% of games played

No.	Player	G	AB	H	Avg.	HR	RBI
00	Lauren Burke	56	159	48	.302	3	33
2	Janae Jefferson	51	168	75	.446	5	26
4	Brianna Cantu	32	35	11	.314	3	12
5	Jordyn Whitaker	42	67	24	.358	4	16
7	Molly Jacobsen	5	1	0	.000	0	0
9	McKenzie Parker	50	120	44	.367	8	26
11	Alyssa Washington	31	55	14	.255	3	7
12	Bailey Williams	12	9	1	.111	0	0
13	Shannon Rhodes	55	172	61	.355	15	55
14	Ryleigh White	6	0	0	.000	0	0
15	Courtney Day	33	62	20	.323	2	11
16	Alyssa Popelka	27	40	15	.375	0	5
17	Taylor Ellsworth	48	113	42	.372	7	31
18	Jayden Smith	35	69	22	.319	2	13
19	Colleen Sullivan	50	117	37	.316	7	32
20	Carlee Ratcliff	16	9	2	.222	0	0
21	Ariana Adams	5	0	0	.000	0	0
22	MK Tedder	38	19	6	.364	0	1
25	Kaitlyn Washington	44	86	28	.324	3	20
27	London Marder	7	7	1	.143	0	1
28	Camille Corona	42	38	13	.342	0	4
29	Shea O’Leary	4	0	0	.000	0	0
33	Mary Iakopo	56	149	48	.373	16	45

=== Pitching ===
Player	G	GS	IP	W	L	ERA	SO	SV
Molly Jacobsen	26	17	91.0	14	6	3.23	76	1
Ryleigh White	20	7	51.0	5	1	3.57	40	0
Courtney Day	11	5	34.1	4	1	3.67	23	1
Ariana Adams	10	3	25.1	4	0	1.66	20	1
Shea O’Leary	34	25	161.2	16	6	1.82	121	3

== Rankings ==
Ranking movements Legend: ██ Increase in ranking ██ Decrease in ranking т = Tied with team above or below
	Week																
Poll	Pre	1	2	3	4	5	6	7	8	9	10	11	12	13	14	15	Final
NFCA / USA Today	6	7	7	7	10	10	8	7	7	7	9	7	11	10	11	12	12
Softball America	7	8	7	6	10	10	7	5	6	6	9	9	12	12	15	13	13
ESPN.com/USA Softball	7	7	7	7	11	11	10	9	8т	8	12	12	14	13	13	12	12
D1Softball	9	9	8	8	11	12	13	13	12	11	14	14	18	17	15	16	16
