= 2021 Oklahoma Sooners softball team =

American college softball season

2021 Oklahoma Sooners softball

National Champion Big 12 Tournament champion Big 12 regular season champion
- Conference: Big 12 Conference
- Record: 56–4 (16–1 Big 12)
- Head coach: Patty Gasso (27th season)
- Home stadium: OU Softball Complex

2021 Big 12 Conference softball standings
	Conf.				Overall
Team	W		L	PCT	W		L	PCT
No. 1 Oklahoma ‍†‍‡‍^{y}	16	–	1	.941	56	–	4	.933
No. 7 Oklahoma State ‍‍‍^{y}	15	–	3	.833	48	–	12	.800
No. 11 Texas ‍‍‍^{y}	12	–	6	.667	43	–	14	.754
Baylor ‍‍‍^{y}	8	–	9	.471	27	–	23	.540
Iowa State ‍‍‍^{y}	6	–	12	.333	34	–	23	.596
Texas Tech ‍‍‍	3	–	15	.167	21	–	26	.447
Kansas ‍‍‍	2	–	16	.111	22	–	26	.458
† – Conference champion ‡ – Tournament champion y – Invited to the NCAA tournament As of June 10, 2021; Rankings from NFCA/USA Today

The 2021 Oklahoma Sooners softball team was an American college softball team that represented the University of Oklahoma during the 2021 NCAA Division I softball season. The Sooners were led by Patty Gasso in her twenty-seventh season, and played their home games at OU Softball Complex. They competed in the Big 12 Conference, where they finished the season with a 56–4 record, including 16–1 in conference play.

The Sooners won the 2021 Big 12 Tournament, and qualified for the 2021 NCAA Division I softball tournament. They advanced to the 2021 Women's College World Series, where they defeated Florida State in three games to win their fifth championship in program history. The Sooners homered in 58 of their 60 games, including 45 multi-home run games, and set the NCAA Division I single-season record for team batting average (.405), team slugging percentage (.778), on-base percentage (.490), home runs (161), runs scored (638), runs per game (10.63), home runs per game (2.68) and total bases (1,279). They also set Women's College World Series records for home runs (15), runs scored (49) and hits (67).

== Roster ==
2021 Oklahoma Sooners roster
Pitchers: 4 – Shannon Saile – Redshirt Senior; 7 – Olivia Rains – Sophomore; 13 – Macy McAdoo – Sophomore; 18 – Brooke Vestal – Redshirt Sophomore; 19 – Nicole May – Freshman; 42 – Giselle Juarez – Redshirt Senior; 48 – Alanna Thiede – Sophomore; Catchers: 1 – Kinsey Koeltzow – Junior; 9 – Kinzie Hansen – Sophomore; 22 – Lynnsie Elam – Senior; Outfielders: 1 – Rylie Boone – Sophomore	Infielders: 3 – Grace Lyons – Junior; 5 – Taylon Snow – Senior; 12 – Mackenzie Donihoo – Sophomore; 20 – Jana Johns – Senior; 23 – Tiare Jennings – Freshman; 33 – Zaida Puni – Freshman; Utility: 6 – Paige Knight – Freshman; 11 – Nicole Mendes – Redshirt Senior; 21 – Grace Green – Junior; 24 – Jayda Coleman – Freshman; 25 – Raylee Pogue – Sophomore; 78 – Jocelyn Alo – Senior

== Schedule ==
2021 Oklahoma Sooners softball game log
Regular season (42–2)

February (12–0)
Date	Opponent	Rank	Site/stadium	Score	Win	Loss	Save	Attendance	Overall Record	Big 12 Record
February 11	at UTEP	No. 4	Helen of Troy Field; El Paso, TX	29–0 ^{(5)}	**Juarez** (1–0)	Salazar (0–1)	**Rains** (1)	0	1–0	–
February 11	vs Abilene Christian	No. 4	Helen of Troy Field	9–0 ^{(5)}	**May** (1–0)	White (0–1)	—	0	2–0	–
February 12	vs Abilene Christian	No. 4	Helen of Troy Field	11–0 ^{(5)}	**Juarez** (2–0)	Sinnott (0–1)	—	0	3–0	–
February 12	at UTEP	No. 4	Helen of Troy Field	21–2 ^{(5)}	**May** (2–0)	Collins (0–1)	—	86	4–0	–
February 21	at Houston	No. 2	Cougar Softball Stadium; Houston, TX	12–4 ^{(6)}	**Juarez** (3–0)	Hertenberger (1–1)	—	120	5–0	–
February 21	at Houston	No. 2	Cougar Softball Stadium	5–3	**May** (3–0)	Lee (0–1)	**Saile** (1)	120	6–0	–
February 22	vs. Tarleton	No. 2	Cougar Softball Stadium	13–0 ^{(5)}	**Saile** (1–0)	Bridges (0–3)	—	0	7–0	–
February 26	vs. New Mexico	No. 2	Farrington; Tempe, AZ	8–0 ^{(5)}	**Saile** (2–0)	Guindon (1–3)	—	147	8–0	–
February 26	at No. 13 Arizona State	No. 2	Farrington	5–3	**Juarez** (4–0)	Royalty (3–1)	**Saile** (2)	285	9–0	–
February 27	vs. New Mexico	No. 2	Farrington	33–4 ^{(5)}	**May** (3–0)	Hannappel (0–1)	—	0	10–0	–
February 27	at Grand Canyon	No. 2	GCU Softball Stadium; Phoenix, AZ	14–0 ^{(5)}	**Saile** (3–0)	Hambrick (2–4)	—	65	11–0	–
February 27	vs. Portland State	No. 2	GCU Softball Stadium	8–0 ^{(5)}	**Juarez** (5–0)	Grey (1–1)	—	45	12–0	–

March (13–0)
Date	Opponent	Rank	Site/stadium	Score	Win	Loss	Save	Attendance	Overall Record	Big 12 Record
March 5	Sam Houston State	No. 1	OU Softball Complex; Norman, OK	7–0	**May** (5–0)	Billmeier (0–1)	—	184	13–0	–
March 6	No. 18 Missouri	No. 1	OU Softball Complex	5–2	**Juarez** (6–0)	Krings (3–1)	—	0	14–0	–
March 6	ULM	No. 1	OU Softball Complex	9–0 ^{(5)}	**Saile** (4–0)	Chavarria (1–2)	—	216	15–0	–
March 7	No. 18 Missouri	No. 1	OU Softball Complex	11–0 ^{(5)}	**Saile** (5–0)	Weber (5–1)	—	150	16–0	–
March 7	Sam Houston State	No. 1	OU Softball Complex	17–0 ^{(5)}	**Thiede** (1–0)	Fitzpatrick (0–2)	—	200	17–0	–
March 10	UT Arlington	No. 1	OU Softball Complex	14–0 ^{(5)}	**May** (6–0)	Gardiner (1–1)	—	405	18–0	–
March 12	Houston	No. 1	Hall of Fame Stadium; Oklahoma City, OK	9–1 ^{(5)}	**Saile** (6–0)	Lee (2–4)	—	0	19–0	–
March 12	Kansas City	No. 1	Hall of Fame Stadium	6–2	**Juarez** (7–0)	Hoveland (5–3)	—	0	20–0	–
March 14	Liberty	No. 1	Hall of Fame Stadium	5–4	**May** (7–0)	Wagoner (2–2)	—	550	21–0	–
March 14	Liberty	No. 1	Hall of Fame Stadium	16–0 ^{(5)}	**May** (8–0)	Kirby (4–3)	—	1,083	22–0	–
March 26	at Iowa State	No. 1	Cyclone Sports Complex; Ames, IA	9–7	**Juarez** (8–0)	Charles (10–3)	—	527	23–0	1–0
March 27	at Iowa State	No. 1	Cyclone Sports Complex	10–2 ^{(6)}	**Saile** (7–0)	Swain (1–2)	—	560	24–0	2–0
March 28	at Iowa State	No. 1	Cyclone Sports Complex	22–2 ^{(5)}	**May** (9–0)	Charles (10–4)	—	0	25–0	3–0

April (14–1)
Date	Opponent	Rank	Site/stadium	Score	Win	Loss	Save	Attendance	Overall Record	Big 12 Record
April 1	Kansas	No. 1	OU Softball Complex	14–0 ^{(5)}	**Saile** (8–0)	Goff (7–3)	—	449	26–0	4–0
April 2	Kansas	No. 1	OU Softball Complex	6–2	**Juarez** (9–0)	Mills (1–2)	—	445	27–0	5–0
April 3	Kansas	No. 1	OU Softball Complex	10–1 ^{(5)}	**Juarez** (10–0)	Hamilton (3–6)	—	465	28–0	6–0
April 10	vs. Mississippi State	No. 1	Dr. Billy Bundrick Field; Ruston, LA	9–0 ^{(5)}	**Juarez** (11–0)	Williams (3–4)	—	500	29–0	–
April 10	at Louisiana Tech	No. 1	Dr. Billy Bundrick Field	10–0 ^{(5)}	**May** (10–0)	Hernandez (6–6)	—	500	30–0	–
April 16	No. 7 Texas	No. 1	OU Softball Complex	11–1 ^{(5)}	**Juarez** (12–0)	O'Leary (9–1)	—	459	31–0	7–0
April 17	No. 7 Texas	No. 1	OU Softball Complex	10–2 ^{(5)}	**Saile** (9–0)	Jacobsen (11–3)	—	484	32–0	8–0
April 18	No. 7 Texas	No. 1	OU Softball Complex	9–0 ^{(5)}	**May** (11–0)	O'Leary (9–2)	—	497	33–0	9–0
April 20	at No. 21 Georgia	No. 1	Jack Turner Stadium; Athens, GA	6–7 ^{(9)}	Mary Wilson (15–5)	**May** (11–1)	—	400	33–1	–
April 20	at No. 21 Georgia	No. 1	Jack Turner Stadium	12–3 ^{(5)}	**Saile** (10–0)	Cutting (6–5)	—	400	34–1	–
April 24	Texas Tech	No. 1	OU Softball Complex	15–0 ^{(5)}	**Juarez** (13–0)	Zoch (9–10)	—	766	35–1	10–0
April 24	Texas Tech	No. 1	OU Softball Complex	5–0	**Saile** (11–0)	Edmoundson (7–9)	—	766	36–1	11–0
April 25	Texas Tech	No. 1	OU Softball Complex	20–0 ^{(5)}	**Juarez** (14–0)	Zoch (9–11)	—	752	37–1	12–0
April 27	at Baylor	No. 1	Getterman Stadium; Waco, TX	7–1	**Juarez** (15–0)	Rodoni (9–7)	—	600	38–1	13–0
April 27	at Baylor	No. 1	Getterman Stadium	11–0 ^{(6)}	**Saile** (12–0)	Mansell (7–4)	—	600	39–1	14–0

May (3–1)
Date	Opponent	Rank	Site	Score	Win	Loss	Save	Attendance	Overall Record	Big 12 Record
May 4	at No. 25 Wichita State	No. 1	Wilkins Stadium; Wichita, KS	14–3 ^{(5)}	**Saile** (13–0)	Lange (19–6)	—	730	40–1	–
May 7	at No. 9 Oklahoma State	No. 1	Cowgirl Stadium; Stillwater, OK	4–6	Eberle (19–1)	**Juarez** (15–1)	—	609	40–2	14–1
May 8	at No. 9 Oklahoma State	No. 1	Cowgirl Stadium	6–4	**Saile** (14–0)	Maxwell (14–3)	**May** (1)	652	41–2	15–1
May 9	at No. 9 Oklahoma State	No. 1	Cowgirl Stadium	11–8	**May** (12–1)	Eberle (19–2)	—	663	42–2	16–1

Postseason (14–2)

Big 12 tournament (3–0)
Date	Opponent	Rank	Site	Score	Win	Loss	Save	Attendance	Overall Record	B12T Record
May 14	vs. Baylor	No. 1	Hall of Fame Stadium	10–2 ^{(5)}	**Saile** (15–0)	Binford (5–4)	—	3,839	43–2	1–0
May 14	vs. Texas Tech	No. 1	Hall of Fame Stadium	8–2	**Juarez** (16–1)	Edmoundson (7–11)	—	3,839	44–2	2–0
May 15	vs. No. 9 Oklahoma State; Final	No. 1	Hall of Fame Stadium	10–2 ^{(6)}	**Saile** (16–0)	Eberle (21–3)	—	3,879	45–2	3–0

Norman Regional (3–0)
Date	Opponent	Rank	Site	Score	Win	Loss	Save	Attendance	Overall Record	Regional Record
May 21	vs. Morgan State	No. 1	OU Softball Complex	19–0 ^{(6)}	**Juarez** (17–1)	Rundlett (12–8)	—	1,555	46–2	1–0
May 22	vs. No. 23 Wichita State	No. 1	OU Softball Complex	7–5	**Juarez** (18–1)	Lange (22–6)	**May** (2)	1,556	47–2	2–0
May 23	vs. No. 23 Wichita State	No. 1	OU Softball Complex	24–7	**May** (13–1)	Lange (22–8)	—	1,668	48–2	3–0

Norman Super Regional (2–0)
Date	Opponent	Rank	Site	Score	Win	Loss	Save	Attendance	Overall Record	Super Reg. Record
May 28	vs. No. 6 Washington	No. 1	OU Softball Complex	4–2	**May** (14–1)	Plain (32–4)	—	1,758	49–2	1–0
May 28	vs. No. 6 Washington	No. 1	OU Softball Complex	9–1 ^{(5)}	**Saile** (17–0)	Plain (32–5)	—	1,800	50–2	2–0

Women's College World Series (6–2)
Date	Opponent	Rank	Site	Score	Win	Loss	Save	Attendance	Overall Record	WCWS Record
June 3	vs. No. 22 James Madison; First round	No. 1	Hall of Fame Stadium	3–4 ^{(8)}	Alexander (17–1)	**Saile** (17–1)	—	—	50–3	0–1
June 5	vs. Georgia; First round	No. 1	Hall of Fame Stadium	8–0 ^{(6)}	**Juarez** (19–1)	Wilson Avant (20–12)	—	—	51–3	1–1
June 5	vs. No. 2 UCLA; Second round	No. 1	Hall of Fame Stadium	10–3	**Juarez** (20–1)	Garcia (18–3)	—	—	52–3	2–1
June 6	vs. No. 22 James Madison; Semifinals	No. 1	Hall of Fame Stadium	6–3	**May** (15–1)	Alexander (18–2)	—	—	53–3	3–1
June 7	vs. No. 22 James Madison; Semifinals	No. 1	Hall of Fame Stadium	7–1	**Juarez** (21–1)	Alexander (18–3)	—	—	54–3	4–1
June 8	vs. No. 8 Florida State; Final – Game 1	No. 1	Hall of Fame Stadium	4–8	Watson (12–1)	**May** (15–2)	—	12,173	54–4	4–2
June 9	vs. No. 8 Florida State; Final – Game 2	No. 1	Hall of Fame Stadium	6–2	**Juarez** (22–1))	Sandercock (27–4)	—	12,115	55–4	5–2
June 10	vs. No. 8 Florida State; Final – Game 3	No. 1	Hall of Fame Stadium	5–1	**Juarez** (23–1))	Watson (12–2)	—	10,830	56–4	6–2

- Win
- Loss
- Postponement
- Bold: Sooners team member
- Rankings from NFCA:
- (#) Tournament seedings in parentheses.

== Rankings ==
Ranking movements Legend: ██ Increase in ranking ██ Decrease in ranking
	Week															
Poll	Pre	1	2	3	4	5	6	7	8	9	10	11	12	13	14	Final
NFCA / USA Today	4	3	2	1	1	1	1	1	1	1	1	1	1	1	1	1
Softball America	5	2	2	1	1	1	1	1	1	1	1	1	1	1	1	1
ESPN.com/USA Softball	4	2	2	1	1	1	1	1	1	1	1	1	1	1	1	1
D1Softball	2	2	2	1	1	1	1	1	1	1	1	1	1	1	1	1

== Awards and honors ==
Weekly Awards
Player	Award	Date Awarded	Ref.
Tiare Jennings	Big 12 Player of the Week	February 16, 2021	
Tiare Jennings	Big 12 Player of the Week	March 9, 2021	
Shannon Saile	Co-Big 12 Pitcher of the Week	March 9, 2021	
Jocelyn Alo	Big 12 Player of the Week	March 16, 2021	
Jocelyn Alo	Big 12 Player of the Week	March 30, 2021	
Tiare Jennings	Big 12 Player of the Week	April 7, 2021	
Tiare Jennings	Co-Big 12 Player of the Week	April 20, 2021	
Shannon Saile	Big 12 Pitcher of the Week	April 27, 2021	

Individual Awards
Player	Award	Ref.
Jocelyn Alo	Big 12 Player of the Year; USA Softball Collegiate Player of the Year	
Tiare Jennings	Big 12 Freshman of the Year; NFCA National Freshman of the Year	
Grace Lyons	Big 12 Defensive Player of the Year	
Patty Gasso	Big 12 Coach of the Year	

All-Big 12
Player	Selection	Ref.
Jocelyn Alo	First Team	
Jayda Coleman	First Team	
Tiare Jennings	First Team	
Grace Lyons	First Team	
Shannon Saile	First Team	
Mackenzie Donihoo	Second Team	
Lynnsie Elam	Second Team	
Giselle Juarez	Second Team	
Jayda Coleman	Freshman Team	
Tiare Jennings	Freshman Team	
Nicole May	Freshman Team	

All-American
Player	Selection	Ref.
Jocelyn Alo	First Team	
Jayda Coleman	First Team	
Tiare Jennings	First Team	
Kinzie Hansen	Second Team	
Grace Lyons	Second Team	
