= 2014 American Athletic Conference softball tournament =

American college softball tournament

- Teams: 8
- Format: Single-elimination tournament
- Finals site: Cougar Softball Stadium; Houston, Texas
- Champions: Louisville (1st title)
- Winning coach: Sandy Pearsall (1st title)
- MVP: Katie Keller (Louisville)

2014 American Athletic Conference softball standings
	Conf.				Overall
Team	W		L	PCT	W		L	PCT
UCF ‍†‍‍^{y}	15	–	3	.833	43	–	18	.705
South Florida ‍‍‍^{y}	13	–	5	.722	43	–	17	.717
Louisville ‍‍‡‍^{y}	14	–	7	.667	36	–	22	.621
Houston ‍‍‍^{y}	13	–	8	.619	33	–	23	.589
Rutgers ‍‍‍	9	–	9	.500	28	–	19	.596
Temple ‍‍‍	5	–	13	.278	15	–	30	.333
Memphis ‍‍‍	5	–	15	.250	23	–	33	.411
UConn ‍‍‍	3	–	17	.150	13	–	38	.255
† – Conference champion ‡ – Tournament champion y – Invited to the NCAA tournament As of May 18, 2014; Rankings from USA Today/NFCA Coaches

The 2014 American Athletic Conference softball tournament was held at the Cougar Softball Stadium on the campus of the University of Houston in Houston, Texas, from May 8 through May 11, 2014. The tournament determined the champion of the American Athletic Conference for the 2014 NCAA Division I softball season. Louisville won the tournament and earned the American Athletic Conference's automatic bid to the 2014 NCAA Division I softball tournament.

== Format and seeding ==
The conference's 8 teams were seeded based on conference winning percentage based on the round-robin regular season. They then played a single elimination tournament.

Team	W	L	Pct.	GB	Seed
UCF	15	3	.833	—	1
South Florida	13	5	.722	2	2
Louisville	14	7	.667	2.5	3
Houston	13	8	.619	3.5	4
Rutgers	9	9	.500	6	5
Temple	5	13	.278	10	6
Memphis	5	15	.250	11	7
UConn	3	17	.150	13	8

== Results ==
=== Bracket ===
Quarterfinals
1	UCF	6
8	UConn	0
4	Houston	1
5	Rutgers	5
3	Louisville	5
6	Temple	3
2	South Florida	5
7	Memphis	3

Semifinals
1	UCF	8
5	Rutgers	5
2	South Florida	0
3	Louisville	8^{6}

Finals
1	UCF	2
3	Louisville	3

=== Game results ===
Date	Game	Winner	Score	Loser
May 8	Game 1	(3) Louisville	5–3	(6) Temple
May 8	Game 2	(2) South Florida	5–3	(7) Memphis
May 8	Game 3	(1) UCF	6–0	(8) UConn
May 8	Game 4	(5) Rutgers	8–5	(4) Houston
May 9	Game 5	(3) Louisville	8–0 ^{(6)}	(2) South Florida
May 10	Game 6	(1) UCF	8–5	(5) Rutgers
May 11	Game 7	(3) Louisville	3–2	(1) UCF

== All-Tournament Team ==
The following players were named to the All-Tournament Team.

Pos.	Name	School
CF	Juli Weber	USF
1B	Alexis Durando	Rutgers
P	Alyssa Landrith	Rutgers
1B	Samantha McCloskey	UCF
CF	Mariah Garcia	UCF
P	Mackenzie Audas	UCF
3B	Farrah Sullivan	UCF
CF	Kayla Soles	Louisville
DH	Brittany Duncan	Louisville
C	Taner Fowler	Louisville
P	Rachel LeCoq	Louisville
2B	Katie Keller	Louisville

=== Most Outstanding Player ===
Katie Keller was named Most Outstanding Player. Keller was 5 for 5 with three home runs, including a grand slam, in the tournament.
