= Big 12 Conference Softball Defensive Player of the Year =

Big 12 Conference Defensive Player of the Year
- Awarded for: the most outstanding college softball defensive player in the Big 12 Conference
- Country: United States

History
- First award: 2004
- Most recent: Regan Shockey, Arizona & Hailey Cripe, Kansas

The Big 12 Conference Softball Defensive Player of the Year is a college softball award given to the Big 12 Conference's most outstanding defensive player. The award has been given annually from 2004 to 2012, and 2016 to present.

== Winners ==
Season	Player	School	Reference
2004	Heather Scaglione	Oklahoma	
2005	Heather Scaglione (2)	Oklahoma	
2006	Megan Willis	Texas	
2007	Megan Willis (2)	Texas	
2008	Savannah Long	Oklahoma	
2009	Natalie Villarreal	Texas A&M	
2010	Lindsey Vandever	Oklahoma	
2011	Natalie Villarreal; Megan Christopher	Texas A&M; Missouri	
2012	Corrin Genovese	Missouri	
2016	Kelsey Arnold	Oklahoma	
2017	Jessie Scroggins	Baylor	
2018	Kelsey Arnold (2)	Oklahoma	
2019	Caleigh Clifton	Oklahoma	
2021	Grace Lyons	Oklahoma	
2022	Grace Lyons (2)	Oklahoma	
2023	Grace Lyons (3)	Oklahoma	
2024	Kinzie Hansen	Oklahoma	
2025	Presleigh Pilon	Baylor	
2026	Regan Shockey; Hailey Cripe	Arizona; Kansas	

== Winners by school ==
School	Winners	Years
Oklahoma	11	2004, 2005, 2008, 2010, 2016, 2018, 2019, 2021, 2022, 2023, 2024
Baylor	2	2017, 2025
Missouri	2	2011, 2012
Texas	2	2006, 2007
Texas A&M	2	2009, 2011
Arizona	1	2026
Kansas	1	2026
Arizona State	0	—
BYU	0	—
Houston	0	—
Iowa State	0	—
Oklahoma State	0	—
Texas Tech	0	—
UCF	0	—
Utah	0	—
