= 2021 Big 12 Conference softball tournament =

- Teams: 7
- Finals site: ASA Hall of Fame Stadium; Oklahoma City, OK
- Champions: Oklahoma (7th title)
- Runner-up: Oklahoma State
- Winning coach: Patty Gasso (7th title)
- MVP: Kinzie Hansen (Oklahoma)
- Television: ESPNU; ESPN+ ESPN2

2021 Big 12 Conference softball standings
	Conf.				Overall
Team	W		L	PCT	W		L	PCT
No. 1 Oklahoma ‍†‍‡‍^{y}	16	–	1	.941	56	–	4	.933
No. 7 Oklahoma State ‍‍‍^{y}	15	–	3	.833	48	–	12	.800
No. 11 Texas ‍‍‍^{y}	12	–	6	.667	43	–	14	.754
Baylor ‍‍‍^{y}	8	–	9	.471	27	–	23	.540
Iowa State ‍‍‍^{y}	6	–	12	.333	34	–	23	.596
Texas Tech ‍‍‍	3	–	15	.167	21	–	26	.447
Kansas ‍‍‍	2	–	16	.111	22	–	26	.458
† – Conference champion ‡ – Tournament champion y – Invited to the NCAA tournament As of June 10, 2021; Rankings from NFCA/USA Today

The 2021 Big 12 Conference softball tournament was held at ASA Hall of Fame Stadium in Oklahoma City, Oklahoma on May 14 and May 15, 2021. As the winner of the tournament, Oklahoma earned the conference's automatic bid to the 2021 NCAA Division I softball tournament. Most of the games of the tournament aired on ESPN+. However, the first game aired on ESPNU and the championship game aired on ESPN2. The Oklahoma Sooners came into the tournament with the best record from conference play at 16–1.

== Standings ==
Place	Seed	Team	Conference			Overall		
Place	Seed	Team	W	L	%	W	L	%
1	1	Oklahoma	16	1	.941	42	2	.955
2	2	Oklahoma State	15	3	.833	40	8	.833
3	3	Texas	12	6	.667	38	9	.809
4	4	Baylor	8	9	.471	27	18	.600
5	5	Iowa State	6	12	.333	31	19	.620
6	6	Texas Tech	3	15	.167	19	25	.432
7		Kansas	2	16	.111	22	26	.458

- Kansas did not participate in the tournament

== Format and seeding ==
The top six teams based on conference winning percentage from the conference's regular season were seeded one through six. Teams were divided into two pools of three teams each. The winners of each pool advanced to the championship game. The second- and third-place teams in each pool played in classification games for third and fifth place, respectively.

== Tournament ==
=== Pool A ===
No. 4 Baylor vs. No. 6 Texas Tech

- No. 6 Texas Tech wins 8–6

No. 1 Oklahoma vs. No. 4 Baylor

- No. 1 Oklahoma wins 10–2

No. 1 Oklahoma vs. No. 6 Texas Tech

- No. 1 Oklahoma wins 8–2

=== Pool B ===
No. 2 Oklahoma State vs. No. 3 Texas

- No. 2 Oklahoma State wins 3–2

No. 3 Texas vs. No. 5 Iowa State

- No. 3 Texas wins 7–4

No. 2 Oklahoma State vs. No. 5 Iowa State

- No. 2 Oklahoma State wins 6–5

=== Championship Day ===
No. 4 Baylor vs. No. 5 Iowa State

- Iowa State wins 3–1

No. 6 Texas Tech vs. No. 3 Texas

- Texas Tech wins 5–1

No. 1 Oklahoma vs. No. 2 Oklahoma State

- No. 1 Oklahoma wins 10–2 ^{(6)}

== Schedule ==
Game	Time*	Matchup^{#}	Television	Location	Attendance
First Round – Friday, May 10
1	11:00 a.m.	#2 Oklahoma State 3, #3 Texas 2	ESPNU	Integris Field	
2	11:00 a.m.	#6 Texas Tech 8, #4 Baylor 6	ESPN+	OGE Energy Field	
3	2:00 p.m.	#3 Texas 7, #5 Iowa State 4	ESPN+	Integris Field	
4	2:00 p.m.	#1 Oklahoma 10, #4 Baylor 2	ESPN+	OGE Energy Field	
5	5:00 p.m.	#2 Oklahoma State 6, #5 Iowa State 5	ESPN+	Integris Field	
6	7:30 p.m.	#1 Oklahoma 8, #6 Texas Tech 2	ESPN+	OGE Energy Field	
Championship Day – Saturday, May 11
7	10:30 a.m.	#5 Iowa State 3, #4 Baylor 1	ESPN+	Integris Field	
8	10:30 a.m.	#6 Texas Tech 5, #3 Texas 1	ESPN+	OGE Energy Field	
9	3:00 p.m.	#1 Oklahoma 8, #2 Oklahoma State 2	ESPN2	OGE Energy Field	
*Game times in CDT. # – Rankings denote tournament seed.

== All-Tournament Team ==
The following players were named to the all-tournament team:

Player	School
Sami Williams	Iowa State
Kinzie Hansen (MOP)	Oklahoma
Jocelyn Alo	Oklahoma
Jayda Coleman	Oklahoma
Lynnsie Elam	Oklahoma
Tiare Jennings	Oklahoma
Nicole May	Oklahoma
Shannon Saile	Oklahoma
Hayley Busby	Oklahoma State
Carrie Eberle	Oklahoma State
Alysen Febrey	Oklahoma State
Kiley Naomi	Oklahoma State
Karli Petty	Oklahoma State
