= Kyla Holas =

American softball coach (born 1971)

Biographical details
- Born: October 4, 1971 (age 55); Pasadena, Texas, U.S.

Playing career
- 1991–1994: Southwestern Louisiana
- Position: Pitcher

Coaching career (HC unless noted)
- 1996–1997: Northern Illinois (asst.)
- 1998–2000: Florida (asst.)
- 2001–2016: Houston
- 2017: Chicago Bandits (asst.)

Head coaching record
- Overall: 563–376–1 (.599)

Accomplishments and honors

Championships
- 3 C-USA regular season (2007, 2008, 2011); C-USA tournament (2007)

Awards
- 2× C-USA Coach of the Year (2007, 2008)

Kyla Holas (née Hall; born October 4, 1971) is an American former softball coach who last served as an assistant for the Chicago Bandits of the National Pro Fastpitch. She previously served as head coach at the University of Houston.

== Head coaching record ==
Record table
Season	Team	Overall	Conference	Standing	Postseason
Houston Cougars (Conference USA) (2001–2013)
2001	Houston	22–33	10–10	5th	
2002	Houston	35–25	9–14	7th	
2003	Houston	36–24	15–9	3rd	
2004	Houston	39–25	12–11	5th	NCAA Regional
2005	Houston	30–28	11–12	5th	
2006	Houston	40–23	15–9	3rd	
2007	Houston	44–18	20–4	1st	NCAA Regional
2008	Houston	54–11	21–2	1st	NCAA Super Regional
2009	Houston	25–24	12–10	3rd	
2010	Houston	30–24–1	12–10–1	5th	
2011	Houston	44–18	19–5	T–1st	NCAA Super Regional
2012	Houston	35–24	15–9	3rd	NCAA Regional
2013	Houston	41–20	19–5	2nd	NCAA Regional
Houston Cougars (American Athletic Conference) (2014–2016)
2014	Houston	33–23	13–8	4th	NCAA Regional
2015	Houston	28–27	10–7	3rd	
2016	Houston	27–29	9–9	T–3rd	
Houston:		563–376–1 (.599)	222–134–1 (.623)		
Total:		563–376–1 (.599)			
National champion Postseason invitational champion Conference regular season champion Conference regular season and conference tournament champion Division regular season champion Division regular season and conference tournament champion Conference tournament champion
