= Kinzie Hansen =

American softball player (born 2001)

Oklahoma City Spark
- Catcher
- Born: October 12, 2001 (age 24); Norco, California, U.S.
- Bats: Right Throws: Right

Teams
- Oklahoma (2020–2024); Oklahoma City Spark (2024–present)

Career highlights and awards
- 4× Women's College World Series champion (2021–2024); 3× WCWS All-Tournament Team (2021, 2023, 2024); Big 12 Defensive Player of the Year (2024); First Team All-American (2023); Second Team All-American (2021); 2× First team All-Big 12 (2023, 2024)
Medals
Women's softball
Representing United States
World Games
Gold medal – first place	2022 Birmingham	Team

Kinzie Lee Hansen (born October 12, 2001) is an American professional softball player for the Oklahoma City Spark of the Athletes Unlimited Softball League (AUSL) and is a member of the United States women's national softball team. She played college softball at Oklahoma where she won the Women's College World Series championship four consecutive years.

== Early life ==
Hansen was born to Jason and Nicole Hansen and has one brother, Cole. She played travel ball for the OC Batbusters, and finished the 2018 summer with a .460 batting average, 37 hits, 23 RBIs, 21 runs, 11 home runs and a .990 fielding percentage, and helped lead her team to a national runner-up finish.

== High school career ==
Hansen attended Norco High School in Norco, California. During her freshman year in 2016, she hit .426 with seven home runs, a team-best 37 RBI, 18 walks and a .525 on-base percentage. Following the season, she was named to the Big VIII League first team, and was the only underclassman to be named to the Riverside Press-Enterprise All-Inland first team. She was also named CalHiSports State Freshman of the Year. During her sophomore year in 2017, she had the team’s second-best batting average at .470, and led the team with 43 RBI. Following the season, she was named CalHiSports State Sophomore of the Year. As a junior in 2018, she posted a .596 batting average, 31 hits, 29 RBIs, 11 runs scored, four home runs and a .992 fielding percentage and helped lead her team to the CIF Championship. Following the season she was named CalHiSports State Junior of the Year and HSGameTime Softball Player of the Year. She was also named a first-team All-American, the CIF MVP, the league MVP and the Press Enterprise Softball Player of the Year.

== College career ==
Hansen made her collegiate debut for Oklahoma on February 6, 2020, in a game against Nevada, where she went 2-for-5 with four RBIs. She finished her freshman year in a season that was shortened due to the COVID-19 pandemic with 24 starts, including 22 at first base, and led the Sooners with 26 RBI, ranked second on the team with 31 hits and 11 walks and fourth on the team in batting average at .413. She also had a perfect fielding percentage and 152 putouts at first base.

During her sophomore year in 2021, she started 58 games, and batted .438 with 24 home runs, nine doubles and 66 RBIs. Her 24 home runs ranked fifth in the country. Defensively, she recorded 279 putouts and 21 assists with just three errors for .990 fielding percentage. On February 11, 2021, she went 5-for-5 in a game against UTEP, with two home runs, and three RBI. Her five hits tied the single-game program record for hits. During the 2021 Big 12 Conference softball tournament, she recorded five home runs in three games, with eight RBI and a 2.100 slugging percentage. She was subsequently named to the all-tournament team and the Most Outstanding Player of the Big 12 Tournament. During the 2021 Women's College World Series she batted .357 with three home runs, one double and eight RBI, to help lead her team to the Women's College World Series championship. She was also named to the All-tournament Team.

During her junior year in 2022, she started 41 games, after missing part of the season due to injury. She finished the season with a .273 batting average, 33 hits, 29 RBI and eight home runs. During the 2022 Women's College World Series title-clinching championship game, she went 2-for-3 with a three-run home run to help Oklahoma win their second consecutive national championship.

During her senior year in 2023, she appeared in 49 games, with 44 starts at catcher or designated player after missing the first two weeks of the season due to injury. She finished the season with a .409 batting average, seven doubles, one triple, 13 home runs and 57 RBI. Her average of 1.16 RBIs per game ranked seventh in the country. Defensively she had a .993 fielding percentage with 268 putouts and nine assists to just two errors and was named the Johnny Bench Award winner. During game two of the Norman Super Regional at the 2023 NCAA Division I softball tournament, she hit a game-tying three-run home run in the seventh inning against Clemson to help Oklahoma advance to the Women's College World Series. During the 2023 Women's College World Series she hit .357 with a double, home run and four RBIs, to help Oklahoma win their third consecutive national championship. She was subsequently named to the All-tournament Team.

During her graduate student year in 2024, she appeared in 58 games, with 55 starts at catcher or designated player. She finished the season with a .400 batting average, nine doubles, 11 home runs and 41 RBI. Defensively she had a .990 fielding percentage with 282 putouts and 24 assists to just three errors and was named a unanimous All-Big 12 first team selection and Big 12 Defensive Player of the Year. During the 2024 Women's College World Series she had three hits with a double, home run, two RBIs, and three runs scored to help Oklahoma win their fourth consecutive national championship. She was subsequently named to the All-tournament Team.

== Professional career ==
On June 17, 2024, Hansen signed with the Oklahoma City Spark of the AFP. On December 1, 2025, she was drafted second overall by the Oklahoma City Spark in the AUSL allocation draft.

== National team career ==
On January 7, 2022, she was named a member of the United States women's national softball team for the 2022 World Games.
