= Grace Turk =

American softball player

- Shortstop
- Born: October 17, 1999 (age 26); Bitburg, Germany
- Bats: Right Throws: Right

Teams
- Oklahoma (2019–2023)

Career highlights and awards
- 3× Women's College World Series champion (2021–2023); 3× Big 12 Defensive Player of the Year (2021–2023); Softball America Defensive Player of the Year (2023); First Team All-American (2022); Second Team All-American (2021); 3× First team All-Big 12 (2021–2023); All-Big 12 Freshman team (2019)

Grace Turk (née Lyons; born October 17, 1999) is an American former college softball player and a member of the United States women's national softball team. She played college softball for the Oklahoma Sooners where she won three consecutive Women's College World Series from 2021 to 2023.

== Early life ==
Lyons was born to John and Erin Lyons. She was born in Bitburg, Germany, and grew up in Peoria, Arizona, since her dad was an F-16 pilot in the Air force for 25 years. Her father played college ice hockey for the Air Force Academy.

== High school career ==
Lyons attended Sandra Day O'Connor High School in Phoenix, Arizona, where she served as team captain and helped lead her team to the 6A state championship in 2016. In 2017, she hit .526 with 47 runs scored, 35 runs batted in, seven home runs, 14 doubles, three triples and nine stolen bases, while playing shortstop, second base and centerfield.

== College career ==
Lyons began her debut for Oklahoma in 2019. She started all 63 of Oklahoma's games at shortstop and ranked second on the team with 54 assists. Following the season, she was named a unanimous selection to the Big 12 All-Freshman team. During her sophomore year in 2020, she started all 24 of Oklahoma's games at shortstop and ranked second on the team with 40 assists, in a season that was shortened due to the COVID-19 pandemic.

During her junior year in 2021, she started all 60 games at shortstop and helped lead Oklahoma's top-ranked defense with 64 putouts and 65 assists with just five errors for a .963 fielding percentage, and a team-best 11 double plays. She batted .392 with 14 home runs, 12 doubles and 52 RBIs. During the season opener on February 11, 2021, in a game against UTEP, Lyons and Tiare Jennings each homered three times against the Miners, tying a school record for most home runs by an individual player in a game. The Sooners set an NCAA single-game record for home runs in a game with 13. During the regular season she had 45 putouts and 50 assists with just three errors for a .969 fielding percentage and turned six double plays. She was subsequently named the Big 12 Conference Softball Defensive Player of the Year.

During her senior year in 2022, she played in all 62 games, making 61 starts at shortstop. She batted .401, with 23 home runs, seven doubles, three triples and 70 RBIs. She ranked sixth in the country in RBIs and eighth in the country in home runs. Defensively she ranked second on the team with 13 double plays, with 64 putouts and 80 assists with just six errors for .960 fielding percentage. On February 13, 2022, she had her streak of 151 consecutive starts snapped. During the regular season she led the Sooners' defense with 48 putouts and 57 assists and turned 11 double plays. She was subsequently named the Big 12 Conference Softball Defensive Player of the Year for the second consecutive year. She was also named a top-ten finalist for the USA Softball Collegiate Player of the Year.

During her redshirt senior year in 2023 she served as team captain. She led the Sooners' team that ranked first nationally with a .988 fielding percentage. During the regular season she had 42 putouts and 59 assists, with nine double plays and just three errors all season. She was subsequently named the Big 12 Conference Softball Defensive Player of the Year for the third consecutive year. She became the first player in conference history to win the award three times. She posted a career-best .978 fielding percentage in 2023, with just three errors in 134 chances during her final season, and was subsequently named the Softball America Defensive Player of the Year.

== Professional career ==
On April 17, 2023, Lyons was drafted in the sixth round, 22nd overall, by the Texas Smoke in the 2023 Women's Professional Fastpitch draft.

== Personal life ==
On November 19, 2022, American football player Michael Turk, proposed to her on the field following the Bedlam Series football game. The couple got married on June 20, 2023. They have a baby girl called Mercy born in 2025.
