= 2021 NCAA Division I softball rankings =

I was there in the year of /

2021 NCAA Division I softball season
- Duration: February 2021 – June 2021
- Preseason No. 1: UCLA (Unanimous)
- Defending Champions: UCLA
- TV partner/s: ESPN

NCAA Tournament
- Duration: May 20 – June 10, 2021
- Most conference bids: SEC, 12 teams

Women's College World Series
- Duration: June 3–10, 2021
- Champions: Oklahoma (5th title)
- Runners-up: Florida State (14th WCWS Appearance)
- Winning Coach: Patty Gasso (5th title)
- WCWS MOP: Giselle Juarez (Oklahoma)

Seasons
- ← 2020 2022 →

The following human polls made up the 2021 NCAA Division I women's softball rankings. The NFCA/USA Today Poll was voted on by a panel of 32 Division I softball coaches. The NFCA/USA Today poll, the Softball America poll, the ESPN.com/USA Softball Collegiate rankings, and D1Softball ranked the top 25 teams nationally.

== Legend ==
| | Increase in ranking |
| | Decrease in ranking |
| | Not ranked previous week |
| Italics | Number of first place votes |
| (#-#) | Win–loss record |
| т | Tied with team above or below also with this symbol |

== NFCA/USA Today ==
| | Preseason Jan 26 | Week 1 Feb 16 | Week 2 Feb 23 | Week 3 Mar 2 | Week 4 Mar 9 | Week 5 Mar 16 | Week 6 Mar 23 | Week 7 Mar 30 | Week 8 Apr 6 | Week 9 Apr 13 | Week 10 Apr 20 | Week 11 Apr 27 | Week 12 May 4 | Week 13 May 11 | Week 14 May 18 | Final Jun 15 | |
|---|---|---|---|---|---|---|---|---|---|---|---|---|---|---|---|---|---|
| 1. | UCLA (32) | UCLA (31) (1–0) | UCLA (32) (5–0) | Oklahoma (27) (12–0) | Oklahoma (31) (17–0) | Oklahoma (32) (22–0) | Oklahoma (32) (22–0) | Oklahoma (32) (25–0) | Oklahoma (28–0) (32) | Oklahoma (30–0) (32) | Oklahoma (33–0) (32) | Oklahoma (37–1) (32) | Oklahoma (39–1) (32) | Oklahoma (42–2) (25) | Oklahoma (45–2) (32) | Oklahoma (56–4) (32) | 1. |
| 2. | Washington | Washington (5–0) | Oklahoma (6–0) | Arizona (10–0) | Arizona (1) (12–0) | UCLA (15–1) | UCLA (19–1) | UCLA (19–1) | UCLA (19–1) | UCLA (22–2) | UCLA (25–2) | UCLA (28–3) | UCLA (32–3) | UCLA (38–3) (6) | UCLA (41–4) | Florida State (49–13–1) | 2. |
| 3. | Arizona | Oklahoma (1) (4–0) | Arizona (5–0) | Alabama (3) (14–0) | UCLA (10–1) | Alabama (22–1) | Oregon (20–1) | Oregon (23–1) | Oregon (26–2) | Alabama (31–5) | Florida (32–6) | Florida (35–7) | Alabama (39–7) | Alabama (42–7) (1) | Alabama (45–7) | Alabama (52–9) | 3. |
| 4. | Oklahoma | Arizona (0–0) | Alabama (8–0) | UCLA (2) (6–1) | Alabama (19–1) | Oregon (16–1) | Alabama (24–2) | Alabama (26–3) | Alabama (29–4) | Oregon (27–5) | Washington (34–6) | Alabama (36–7) | Florida (37–8) | Florida (40–8) | Florida (42–9) | James Madison (41–4) | 4. |
| 5. | LSU | Alabama (4–0) | Washington (9–1) | Florida (12–0) | Oregon (13–1) | Florida (17–2) | Florida (21–2) | Florida (24–3) | Florida (26–4) | Florida (30–4) | Alabama (33–7) | Washington (35–9) | Washington (35–9) | Washington (39–9) | Arkansas (40–9) | UCLA (47–7) | 5. |
| 6. | Texas | Florida (2–0) | Florida (8–0) | Oregon (9–0) | Florida (14–1) | Washington (20–2) | Washington (22–2) | Washington (24–4) | Washington (28–4) | Washington (31–5) | Oregon (28–8) | Florida State (33–7–1) | Florida State (36–8–1) | Arkansas (40–8) | Washington (41–11) | Oklahoma State (48–12) | 6. |
| 7. | Florida | Texas (0–0) | Texas (2–0) | Texas (8–0) | Oklahoma State (18–1) | Arizona (14–3) | Kentucky (23–2) | Texas (24–3) | Texas (27–3) | Texas (31–3) | Florida State (31–6) | Texas (35–6) | Arizona (33–8) | Florida State (38–9–1) | Oklahoma State (42–9) | Arizona (41–15) | 7. |
| 8. | Alabama | LSU (2–1) | Oregon (7–0) | Washington (13–2) | Washington (16–2) | Oklahoma State (20–2) | Texas (20–3) | Kentucky (24–4) | Arizona (22–5) | Arizona (24–5) | Arkansas (36–5) | Oregon (30–10) | Arkansas (39–7) | Arizona (35–10) | Florida State (39–10–1) | Georgia (34–23) | 8. |
| 9. | Louisiana | Louisiana (0–0) | Louisiana (4–0) | Oklahoma State (13–1) | Kentucky (19–0) | Kentucky (20–2) | Arizona (14–5) | Arizona (18–5) | Florida State (24–6) | Florida State (27–6) | Texas (31–6) | Arizona (31–8) | Oklahoma State (39–6) | Oklahoma State (40–8) | Arizona (36–13) | Florida (45–11) | 9. |
| 10. | Oregon | Oregon (5–0) | Oklahoma State (6–0) | Kentucky (14–0) | Texas (10–2) | Texas (15–2) | Oklahoma State (23–4) | Florida State (20–6) | Arkansas (31–3)т | Arkansas (33–5) | Arizona (27–8) | Arkansas (37–7) | Arizona State (31–12) | Texas (38–9) | Oregon (37–15) | Washington (45–14) | 10. |
| 11. | Oklahoma State | Oklahoma State (2–0) | LSU (5–3) | Arizona State (10–1) | Arizona State (15–1) | Arizona State (17–2) | Duke (24–1) | Oklahoma State (26–5) | Kentucky (27–6)т | Oklahoma State (32–5) | Oklahoma State (35–5) | Oklahoma State (36–5) | Texas (35–9) | Oregon (33–15) | Texas (39–11) | Arkansas (43–11) | 11. |
| 12. | Florida State | Kentucky (3–0) | Kentucky (9–0) | Louisiana (9–3) | LSU (13–6) | LSU (15–7) | Florida State (16–6) | Duke (26–3) | Oklahoma State (29–5) | Kentucky (28–7) | Arizona State (28–11) | Arizona State (28–11) | Oregon (31–13) | Arizona State (32–14) | Arizona State (32–14) | Texas (43–14) | 12. |
| 13. | Kentucky | Florida State (3–1) | Arizona State (6–0) | LSU (10–5) | Duke (15–1) | Florida State (13–5) | LSU (17–8) | Arkansas (28–3) | Arizona State (21–9) | Arizona State (25–10) | Louisiana (34–7) | Clemson (37–4)т | Clemson (37–4) | Clemson (40–5) | Clemson (42–6) | Missouri (42–17) | 13. |
| 14. | Georgia | Virginia Tech (3–0) | Virginia Tech (7–2) | Duke (12–1) | Louisiana (13–4) | Duke (19–1) | Arizona State (17–6) | Arizona State (19–8) | Louisiana (25–6) | Louisiana (31–6) | Kentucky (30–10) | Louisiana (35–9)т | Louisiana (38–9) | Louisiana (40–10) | Missouri (38–15) | Virginia Tech (37–15) | 14. |
| 15. | Virginia Tech | Arizona State (4–0) | Florida State (7–3) | Virginia Tech (7–2) | Florida State (11–4) | Louisiana (13–4) | Arkansas (23–3) | LSU (18–11) | Virginia Tech (23–6) | Virginia Tech (25–6) | Virginia Tech (28–7) | Missouri (34–10) | Missouri (35–13) | Missouri (37–14) | Louisiana (44–10) | LSU (35–22) | 15. |
| 16. | Arizona State | Georgia (2–1) | Duke (8–1) | Florida State (10–3) | Virginia Tech (7–2) | Missouri (19–4) | Louisiana (16–6) | Louisiana (20–6) | Duke (27–6) | LSU (24–13) | Clemson (32–4) | LSU (28–15) | LSU (28–16) | LSU (31–18) | LSU (32–19) | Kentucky (43–16) | 16. |
| 17. | Michigan | Michigan (0–0) | Michigan (0–0) | South Carolina (8–2) | Missouri (15–4) | Arkansas (20–2) | Georgia (21–3) | Missouri (24–7) | LSU (21–12) | Clemson (26–4) | LSU (26–14) | Kentucky (32–12) | Tennessee (38–8) | Kentucky (38–12) | Duke (42–10) | Oregon (40–17) | 17. |
| 18. | Arkansas | Duke (4–0) | South Carolina (2–1) | Missouri (12–2) | Georgia (14–2) | Virginia Tech (10–3) | Missouri (20–6) | Clemson (22–4) | Clemson (26–4) | Missouri (29–9) | Missouri (32–10) | Tennessee (35–8) | Kentucky (35–12) | Michigan (32–6) | Tennessee (41–13) | Clemson (44–8) | 18. |
| 19. | South Carolina | South Carolina (0–0) | Georgia (5–2) | Georgia (9–2) | Arkansas (16–2) | Georgia (19–2) | Virginia Tech (15–4) | Virginia Tech (19–5) | Missouri (28–7) | Tennessee (28–6) | Tennessee (32–7) | Michigan (24–5) | Michigan (28–5) | Tennessee (39–12) | Kentucky (39–13) | Michigan (38–8) | 19. |
| 20. | Mississippi State | Arkansas (0–1) | Missouri (6–2) | Arkansas (11–2) | South Carolina (12–3) | UCF (17–3) | Clemson (20–2) | Georgia (22–5) | Georgia (23–6) | Georgia (25–8) | Michigan (21–4) | Virginia Tech (28–11) | Virginia Tech (32–12) | Virginia Tech (32–12) | Michigan (36–6) | Duke (44–12) | 20. |
| 21. | UCF | Missouri (3–1) | Arkansas (3–2) | Michigan (4–2) | Auburn (15–1) | Tennessee (18–3) | Tennessee (21–5) | Tennessee (23–5) | Tennessee (28–6) | Duke (27–9) | Georgia (27–11) | Georgia (29–14) | Duke (34–10) | Duke (39–10) | Virginia Tech (33–13) | Arizona State (33–16) | 21. |
| 22. | Baylor | Mississippi State (2–0) | UCF (6–1) | UCF (9–2) | Tennessee (17–1) | Auburn (16–4) | UCF (19–6) | UCF (24–6) | Northwestern (18–2) | Michigan (16–4) | Duke (30–10) | Duke (31–10) | Georgia (29–17) | James Madison (31–1) | James Madison (34–1) | Louisiana (47–12) | 22. |
| 23. | Missouri | Baylor (0–0) | Baylor (1–1) | Iowa State (13–2) | Michigan (4–2) | Clemson (16–2) | South Carolina (17–7) | Michigan (13–3) | Michigan (13–3) | UCF (29–9) | Wichita State (32–5–1) | Minnesota (25–7) | Minnesota (25–7) | Minnesota (26–10) | Wichita State (39–11–1) | Tennessee (42–15) | 23. |
| 24. | Minnesota | UCF (3–1) | Minnesota (0–0) | Auburn (10–1) | UCF (12–3) | South Carolina (13–6) | Auburn (18–6) | Northwestern (15–1) | UCF (25–9) | Minnesota (19–5) | Minnesota (22–6) | James Madison (27–1) | James Madison (30–1) | Wichita State (37–11–1) | Minnesota (29–11) | Wichita State (41–13–1) | 24. |
| 25. | Duke | Minnesota (0–0) | Iowa State (9–1) | Tennessee (12–1) | Clemson (13–2) | Michigan (9–3) | Michigan (9–3) | Baylor (21–5) | Texas State (24–3) | Wichita State (28–5) | James Madison (22–1)т UCF (30–12–1)т | UCF (34–12–1) | Wichita State (37–10–1) | Liberty (39–13) | Liberty (42–13) | Liberty (44–15) | 25. |
| | Preseason Jan 26 | Week 1 Feb 16 | Week 2 Feb 23 | Week 3 Mar 2 | Week 4 Mar 9 | Week 5 Mar 16 | Week 6 Mar 23 | Week 7 Mar 30 | Week 8 Apr 6 | Week 9 Apr 13 | Week 10 Apr 20 | Week 11 Apr 27 | Week 12 May 4 | Week 13 May 11 | Week 14 May 18 | Final Jun 15 | |
| | | None | Dropped: No. 22 Mississippi State | Dropped: No. 23 Baylor; No. 24 Minnesota | Dropped: No. 23 Iowa State | None | None | Dropped: No. 23 South Carolina; No. 24 Auburn | Dropped: No. 25 Baylor | Dropped: No. 22 Northwestern; No. 25 Texas State | None | Dropped: No. 23 Wichita State | Dropped: No. 25 UCF | Dropped: No. 22 Georgia | None | Dropped: No. 24 Minnesota | |

== ESPN.com/USA Softball Collegiate Top 25 ==
| | Preseason Jan 26 | Week 1 Feb 16 | Week 2 Feb 23 | Week 3 Mar 2 | Week 4 Mar 9 | Week 5 Mar 16 | Week 6 Mar 23 | Week 7 Mar 30 | Week 8 Apr 6 | Week 9 Apr 13 | Week 10 Apr 20 | Week 11 Apr 27 | Week 12 May 4 | Week 13 May 11 | Week 14 May 18 | Final Jun 10 | |
|---|---|---|---|---|---|---|---|---|---|---|---|---|---|---|---|---|---|
| 1. | UCLA | UCLA (18) (1–0) | UCLA (16) (5–0) | Oklahoma (12) (12–0) | Oklahoma (19) (17–0) | Oklahoma (20) (22–0) | Oklahoma (20) (22–0) | Oklahoma (19) (25–0) | Oklahoma (19) (28–0) | Oklahoma (19) (30–0) | Oklahoma (20) (33–0) | Oklahoma (18) (37–1) | Oklahoma (19) (39–1) | Oklahoma (16) (42–2) | Oklahoma (17) (45–2) | Oklahoma (20) (56–4) | 1. |
| 2. | Washington | Oklahoma (1) (4–0) | Oklahoma (3) (6–0) | Alabama (5) (14–0) | Arizona (1) (12–0) | Alabama (22–1) | UCLA (19–1) | UCLA (19–1) | UCLA (19–1) | UCLA (22–2) | UCLA (25–2) | UCLA (2) (28–3) | UCLA (1) (32–3) | UCLA (3) (38–2) | UCLA (2) (41–4) | Florida State (49–13–1) | 2. |
| 3. | Arizona | Washington (5–0) | Alabama (8–0) | Arizona (1) (10–0) | UCLA (10–1) | UCLA (15–1) | Alabama (24–2) | Oregon (23–1) | Alabama (1) (29–4) | Alabama (1) (31–5) | Florida (32–6) | Florida (35–7) | Alabama (39–7) | Alabama (1) (42–7) | Alabama (1) (45–7) | Alabama (52–9) | 3. |
| 4. | Oklahoma | Arizona (0–0) | Arizona (5–0) | UCLA (2) (6–1) | Alabama (19–1) | Oregon (16–1) | Oregon (20–1) | Alabama (1) (26–3) | Oregon (26–2) | Florida (30–4) | Washington (34–6) | Alabama (36–7) | Florida (37–8) | Florida (40–8) | Florida (42–9) | James Madison (41–4) | 4. |
| 5. | LSU | Florida (1) (2–0) | Florida (8–0) | Florida (12–0) | Florida (14–1) | Florida (17–2) | Florida (21–2) | Florida (24–3) | Florida (26–4) | Oregon (27–5) | Alabama (33–7) | Washington (35–9) | Washington (35–9) | Washington (39–9) | Oklahoma State (42–9) | UCLA (47–7) | 5. |
| 6. | Florida | Alabama (4–0) | Washington (9–1) | Oregon (9–0) | Oregon (13–1) | Oklahoma State (20–2) | Washington (22–2) | Washington (24–4) | Washington (28–4) | Washington (31–5) | Arkansas (36–5) | Florida State (33–7–1) | Arkansas (39–7) | Arkansas (40–8) | Arkansas (40–9)т | Oklahoma State (48–12) | 6. |
| 7. | Texas | Texas (0–0) | Texas (2–0) | Texas (8–0) | Oklahoma State (18–1) | Washington (20–2) | Kentucky (23–2) | Kentucky (24–4) | Arizona (22–5) | Arizona (24–5) | Florida State (31–6)т | Arkansas (37–7) | Oklahoma State (36–5) | Oklahoma State (40–8) | Washington (41–11)т | Arizona (41–15) | 7. |
| 8. | Alabama | Oklahoma State (2–0) | Oklahoma State (6–0) (1) | Oklahoma State (13–1) | Washington (16–2) | Arizona (14–3) | Arizona (14–5) | Arizona (18–5) | Arkansas (31–3)т | Texas (31–3) | Oregon (28–8)т | Arizona State (28–11) | Arizona State (31–12) | Florida State (38–9–1) | Arizona State (32–14) | Georgia (34–23) | 8. |
| 9. | Louisiana | LSU (2–1) | Louisiana (4–0) | Washington (13–2) | Arizona State (15–1) | Arizona State (17–2) | Oklahoma State (23–4) | Texas (24–3) | Texas (27–3)т | Florida State (27–6) | Arizona State (28–11)т | Oklahoma State (36–5) | Florida State (36–5) | Arizona State (32–14) | Florida State (39–10–1) | Florida (45–11) | 9. |
| 10. | Oklahoma State | Louisiana (0–0) | Oregon (7–0) | Arizona State (10–1) | Kentucky (19–0) | Kentucky (20–2) | Texas (20–3) | Florida State (20–6) | Florida State (24–6) | Arkansas (33–5) | Oklahoma State (35–5)т | Oregon (30–10) | Arizona (33–8) | Clemson (40–5) | Clemson (42–6) | Washington (45–14) | 10. |
| 11. | Oregon | Oregon (5–0) | Arizona State (6–0) | Kentucky (14–0) | Texas (10–2) | Texas (15–2) | LSU (17–8) | Arkansas (28–3) | Kentucky (27–6) | Oklahoma State (32–5) | Arizona (27–8) | Arizona (31–8) | Clemson (37–4) | Arizona (35–10) | Oregon (37–15) | Arkansas (43–11) | 11. |
| 12. | Florida State | Kentucky (3–0) | Kentucky (9–0) | LSU (10–5) | LSU (13–6) | LSU (15–7) | Duke (24–1) | Oklahoma State (26–5) | Oklahoma State (29–5) | Kentucky (28–7) | Texas (31–6) | Texas (35–6) | Oregon (31–13) | Oregon (33–15) | Arizona (36–13) | Texas (43–14) | 12. |
| 13. | Kentucky | Arizona State (4–0) | LSU (5–3) | Louisiana (9–3) | Duke (15–1) | Florida State (13–5) | Florida State (16–6) | Arizona State (19–8) | Virginia Tech (23–6) | Arizona State (25–10) | Virginia Tech (28–7) | Clemson (37–4) | LSU (28–16) | Texas (38–9) | Texas (39–11) | Virginia Tech (37–15) | 13. |
| 14. | Georgia | Florida State (3–1) | Virginia Tech (7–2) | Virginia Tech (7–2) | Louisiana (13–4) | Duke (19–1) | Arizona State (17–6) | Duke (26–3) | Arizona State (21–9) | Virginia Tech (25–6) | Kentucky (30–10) | LSU (28–15) | Texas (35–9) | LSU (31–18) | Missouri (38–15) | Missouri (42–17) | 14. |
| 15. | Arizona State | Virginia Tech (3–0) | Florida State (7–3) | Duke (12–1) | Virginia Tech (7–2) | Louisiana (13–4) | Arkansas (23–3) | LSU (18–11) | LSU (21–12) | LSU (24–13) | LSU (26–14) | Missouri (34–10) | Tennessee (38–8) | Missouri (37–14) | LSU (32–19) | LSU (35–22)т | 15. |
| 16. | Virginia Tech | Georgia (2–1) | Duke (8–1) | Florida State (10–3) | Florida State (11–4) | Virginia Tech (10–3) | Virginia Tech (15–4) | Virginia Tech (19–5) | Tennessee (28–6) | Tennessee (28–6) | Clemson (32–4) | Tennessee (35–8) | Missouri (35–13) | Kentucky (38–12) | Kentucky (39–13) | Kentucky (43–16)т | 16. |
| 17. | Michigan | Michigan (0–0) | Michigan (0–0) | Missouri (12–2) | Tennessee (17–1) | Arkansas (20–2) | Louisiana (16–6) | Louisiana (20–6) | Louisiana (25–6) | Louisiana (31–6) | Tennessee (32–7) | Kentucky (32–12) | Kentucky (35–12) | Tennessee (39–12) | Duke (42–10) | Clemson (44–8) | 17. |
| 18. | Baylor | Baylor (0–0) | South Carolina (2–1) | South Carolina (8–2) | Missouri (15–4) | Missouri (19–4) | Georgia (21–3) | Tennessee (23–5) | Clemson (26–4) | Clemson (26–4) | Louisiana (34–7) | Louisiana (35–9) | Louisiana (38–9) | Louisiana (40–10) | Louisiana (44–10) | Duke (44–12) | 18. |
| 19. | South Carolina | Duke (4–0) | Missouri (6–2) | Tennessee (12–1) | Arkansas (16–2) | Tennessee (18–3) | Tennessee (21–5) | Clemson (22–4) | Missouri (28–7) | Missouri (29–9) | Missouri (32–10) | Virginia Tech (28–11) | Michigan (28–5) | Michigan (32–6) | Tennessee (41–13) | Oregon (40–17) | 19. |
| 20. | Minnesota | South Carolina (0–0) | Georgia (5–2) | Arkansas (11–2) | South Carolina (12–3) | Georgia (19–2) | Missouri (20–6) | Missouri (24–7) | Duke (26–7) | Georgia (25–8) | Michigan (21–4) | Michigan (24–5) | Virginia Tech (32–12) | Virginia Tech (32–12) | Michigan (36–6) | Michigan (38–8) | 20. |
| 21. | Arkansas | Missouri (3–1) | Baylor (1–1) | Georgia (9–2) | Georgia (14–2) | UCF (17–3) | Clemson (20–2) | Northwestern (15–1)т | Northwestern (18–2) | Duke (27–9) | Duke (30–10) | Duke (34–10) | Duke (34–10) | Duke (39–10) | James Madison (34–1) | Louisiana (47–12) | 21. |
| 22. | Mississippi State | Minnesota (0–0) | Minnesota (0–0) | Michigan (4–2) | Auburn (15–1) | Northwestern (11–1) | Northwestern (11–1) | UCF (24–6)т | Georgia (23–6) | Michigan (16–4) | Georgia (27–11) | Georgia (29–14) | James Madison (30–1) | James Madison (31–1) | Virginia Tech (33–13) | Arizona State (33–16) | 22. |
| 23. | Tennessee | Tennessee (2–0) | Tennessee (5–1) | Auburn (10–1) | Northwestern (6–0) | Auburn (16–4) | South Carolina (17–7) | Georgia (22–5) | Texas State (24–3) | Minnesota (19–5) | Wichita State (32–5–1) | James Madison (27–1) | Minnesota (25–7) | Wichita State (32–6) | Wichita State (39–11–1) | Wichita State (41–13–1)т | 23. |
| 24. | Missouri | Mississippi State (2–0) | Arkansas (3–2) | UCF (9–2) | UCF (12–3) | South Carolina (13–6) | UCF (19–6) | Texas A&M (23–5) | Michigan (13–3) | James Madison (19–1) | James Madison (22–1) | Minnesota (25–7)т | Georgia (29–17) | Ole Miss (34–19) | Liberty (42–13) | Tennessee (42–15)т | 24. |
| 25. | UCF | Arkansas (0–1) | Mississippi State (3–1) | Northwestern (6–0) | Michigan (4–2) | Clemson (16–2) | Auburn (18–6) | Auburn (19–8) | Texas A&M (25–8) | UCF (29–9) | Minnesota (22–6) | UCF (34–12–1)т | Ole Miss (34–16) | Liberty (39–10) | Ole Miss (34–20) | Liberty (44–15) | 25. |
| | Preseason Jan 26 | Week 1 Feb 16 | Week 2 Feb 23 | Week 3 Mar 2 | Week 4 Mar 9 | Week 5 Mar 16 | Week 6 Mar 23 | Week 7 Mar 30 | Week 8 Apr 6 | Week 9 Apr 13 | Week 10 Apr 20 | Week 11 Apr 27 | Week 12 May 4 | Week 13 May 11 | Week 14 May 18 | Final Jun 10 | |
| | | Dropped: No. 25 UCF | Dropped: None | Dropped: No. 21 Baylor; No. 22 Minnesota; No. 25 Mississippi State | Dropped: None | Dropped: No. 25 Michigan | Dropped: None | Dropped: No. 23 South Carolina | Dropped: No. 21т UCF; No. 25 Auburn | Dropped: No. 21 Northwestern; No. 23 Texas State; No. 25 Texas A&M | Dropped: No. 25 UCF | Dropped: No. 23 Wichita State | Dropped: No. 25т UCF | Dropped: No. 23 Minnesota; No. 24 Georgia | None | Dropped: No. 25 Ole Miss | |

== D1Softball ==
| | Preseason Jan 18 | Week 1 Feb 15 | Week 2 Feb 22 | Week 3 Mar 1 | Week 4 Mar 7 | Week 5 Mar 15 | Week 6 Mar 22 | Week 7 Mar 29 | Week 8 Apr 5 | Week 9 Apr 12 | Week 10 Apr 19 | Week 11 Apr 26 | Week 12 May 3 | Week 13 May 10 | Week 14 May 18 | Final Jun 14 | |
|---|---|---|---|---|---|---|---|---|---|---|---|---|---|---|---|---|---|
| 1. | UCLA | UCLA (1–0) | UCLA (5–0) | Oklahoma (12–0) | Oklahoma (17–0) | Oklahoma (22–0) | Oklahoma (22–0) | Oklahoma (25–0) | Oklahoma (28–0) | Oklahoma (30–0) | Oklahoma (33–0) | Oklahoma (37–1) | Oklahoma (39–1) | Oklahoma (42–2) | Oklahoma (45–2) | Oklahoma (56–4) | 1. |
| 2. | Oklahoma | Oklahoma (4–0) | Oklahoma (7–0) | UCLA (6–1) | UCLA (10–1) | UCLA (15–1) | UCLA (19–1) | UCLA (19–1) | UCLA (19–1) | UCLA (22–2) | UCLA (25–2) | UCLA (28–3) | UCLA (32–3) | UCLA (38–3) | UCLA (41–4) | Florida State (49–13–1) | 2. |
| 3. | Washington | Washington (5–0) | Alabama (8–0) | Alabama (14–0) | Arizona (12–0) | Oregon (16–1) | Oregon (20–1) | Oregon (23–1) | Oregon (26–2) | Alabama (31–5) | Florida (32–6) | Florida (35–7) | Alabama (39–7) | Florida (40–8) | Alabama (45–7) | Alabama (52–9) | 3. |
| 4. | Arizona | Arizona (0–0) | Arizona (5–0) | Arizona (10–0) | Oregon (13–1) | Alabama (22–1) | Washington (22–2) | Alabama (15–2) | Alabama (29–4) | Florida (30–4) | Washington (34–6) | Alabama (36–7) | Florida (37–8) | Alabama (42–7) | Florida (42–9) | James Madison (41–4) | 4. |
| 5. | LSU | Alabama (4–0) | Washington (9–1) | Oregon (10–0) | Oklahoma State (18–1) | Oklahoma State (20–2) | Alabama (24–2) | Florida (24–3) | Florida (26–4) | Oregon (27–5) | Alabama (33–7) | Washington (35–9) | Washington (35–9) | Washington (39–9) | Oklahoma State (42–9) | Oklahoma State (48–12) | 5. |
| 6. | Florida | Florida (2–0) | Florida (8–0) | Oklahoma State (13–1) | Alabama (19–1) | Washington (20–2) | Florida (21–2) | Washington (24–4) | Washington (28–4) | Florida State (27–6) | Florida State (31–6) | Florida State (33–7–1) | Oklahoma State (39–6) | Oklahoma State (40–8) | Arkansas (40–9) | UCLA (47–7) | 6. |
| 7. | Louisiana | LSU (2–1) | Louisiana (4–0) | Florida (12–0) | Washington (16–2) | Florida State (13–5) | Florida State (16–6) | Florida State (20–6) | Florida State (24–6) | Washington (31–5) | Arkansas (36–5) | Oklahoma State (36–5) | Florida State (36–8–1) | Arkansas (40–8) | Washington (41–11) | Arizona (41–15) | 7. |
| 8. | Alabama | Louisiana (0–0) | Texas (2–0) | Texas (8–0) | Florida (14–1) | Florida (17–2) | Oklahoma State (23–4) | Arizona (18–5) | Arkansas (31–3) | Arizona (24–5) | Oregon (28–8) | Arkansas (37–7) | Arkansas (39–7) | Florida State (38–9–1) | Florida State (39–10–1) | Georgia (34–23) | 8. |
| 9. | Texas | Texas (0–0) | Oklahoma State (6–0) | Washington (13–2) | Arizona State (15–1) | Arizona (14–3) | LSU (17–8) | Arkansas (28–3) | Arizona (22–5) | Arkansas (33–5) | Oklahoma State (35–5) | Arizona State (28–11) | Arizona State (31–12) | LSU (31–18) | LSU (32–19) | Washington (45–14) | 9. |
| 10. | Oklahoma State | Oklahoma State (2–0) | Oregon (7–0) | Arizona State (10–1) | LSU (13–6) | LSU (15–7) | Arizona (14–5) | Kentucky (24–4) | Oklahoma State (29–5) | Oklahoma State (32–5) | Arizona State (28–11) | Arizona (31–8) | Arizona (33–8) | Arizona (35–10) | Arizona (36–13) | Florida (45–11) | 10. |
| 11. | Florida State | Oregon (5–0) | Virginia Tech (7–2) | LSU (10–5) | Texas (10–2) | Arizona State (17–2) | Kentucky (23–2) | Oklahoma State (26–5) | Kentucky (27–6) | Texas (31–3) | Arizona (27–8) | LSU (28–15) | LSU (28–16) | Arizona State (32–14) | Oregon (37–15) | Arkansas (43–11) | 11. |
| 12. | Oregon | Florida State (3–1) | LSU (5–3) | Louisiana (9–3) | Arkansas (16–2) | Texas (15–2) | Arkansas (23–3) | LSU (18–11) | Texas (27–3) | Kentucky (28–7) | LSU (26–14) | Missouri (34–10) | Missouri (35–13) | Missouri (37–14) | Missouri (38–15) | Virginia Tech (37–15) | 12. |
| 13. | Georgia | Virginia Tech (3–0) | Arizona State (6–0) | Virginia Tech (7–2) | Kentucky (19–0) | Arkansas (20–2) | Texas (20–3) | Texas (24–3) | Virginia Tech (23–6) | LSU (24–13) | Virginia Tech (28–7) | Oregon (30–10) | Louisiana (38–9) | Oregon (33–15) | Arizona State (32–14) | Missouri (42–17) | 13. |
| 14. | Virginia Tech | Arizona State (4–0) | Florida State (7–3) | Kentucky (14–0) | Virginia Tech (7–2) | Kentucky (20–2) | Virginia Tech (15–4) | Arizona State (19–8) | Arizona State (21–9) | Virginia Tech (25–6) | Texas (31–6) | Texas (35–6) | Oregon (31–13) | Louisiana (41–10) | Louisiana (44–10) | LSU (35–22) | 14. |
| 15. | Mississippi State | Missouri (3–1) | Kentucky (9–0) | Arkansas (11–2) | Florida State (11–4) | Virginia Tech (10–3) | Arizona State (17–6) | Virginia Tech (19–5) | LSU (21–12) | Louisiana (31–6) | Louisiana (34–7) | Clemson (37–4) | Clemson (37–4) | Kentucky (38–12) | Texas (39–11) | Kentucky (43–16) | 15. |
| 16. | Arkansas | Mississippi State (2–0) | Arkansas (3–2) | Florida State (10–3) | Louisiana (13–4) | Louisiana (13–4) | Duke (24–1) | Louisiana (20–6) | Louisiana (25–6) | Arizona State (25–10) | Missouri (32–10) | Louisiana (35–9) | Kentucky (35–12) | Clemson (40–5) | Kentucky (39–13) | Texas (43–14) | 16. |
| 17. | Arizona State | Arkansas (0–1) | Missouri (6–2) | Missouri (12–2) | Duke (14–1) | Duke (19–1) | Georgia (21–3) | Duke (26–3) | Missouri (28–7) | Missouri (29–9) | Kentucky (30–10) | Kentucky (32–12) | Tennessee (38–8) | Texas (38–9) | Clemson (42–6) | Oregon (40–17) | 17. |
| 18. | Michigan | Georgia (2–1) | Mississippi State (3–1) | Duke (12–1) | Missouri (15–4) | Missouri (19–4) | Louisiana (16–6) | Missouri (24–7) | Texas State (24–3) | Tennessee (28–6) | Clemson (32–4) | Tennessee (35–8) | Texas (35–9) | Michigan (32–6) | Michigan (36–6) | Duke (44–12) | 18. |
| 19. | Baylor | Minnesota (0–0) | Minnesota (0–0) | UCF (9–2) | Georgia (14–2) | Georgia (19–2) | Missouri (20–6) | UCF (24–6) | Tennessee (28–6) | Clemson (26–4) | Tennessee (32–7) | Minnesota (25–7) | Minnesota (25–7) | Minnesota (26–10) | Duke (42–10) | Clemson (44–8) | 19. |
| 20. | Minnesota | Kentucky (3–0) | Michigan (0–0) | Iowa State (13–2) | UCF (12–3) | UCF (17–3) | Texas State (17–3) | Northwestern (15–1) | Clemson (26–4) | Wichita State (28–5) | Wichita State (32–5–1) | Virginia Tech (28–11) | Virginia Tech (32–12) | Virginia Tech (32–12) | Virginia Tech (33–13) | Michigan (38–8) | 20. |
| 21. | Tennessee | Michigan (0–0) | Duke (8–1) | Michigan (4–2) | Northwestern (6–0) | Texas State (14–3) | Northwestern (11–1) | Baylor (21–5) | Duke (27–6) | Minnesota (19–5) | Minnesota (22–6) | Michigan (24–5) | Michigan (28–5) | Duke (39–10) | Tennessee (41–13) | Arizona State (33–16) | 21. |
| 22. | UCF | Baylor (0–0) | Iowa State (9–1) | Texas State (6–2) | Michigan (4–2) | Northwestern (11–1) | Tennessee (21–5) | Texas State (20–3) | Northwestern (18–2) | Duke (27–9) | Michigan (21–4) | Duke (34–10) | Ole Miss (34–16) | Tennessee (39–12) | James Madison (34–1) | Tennessee (42–15) | 22. |
| 23. | Missouri | Tennessee (2–0) | Baylor (1–1) | Oregon State (6–2) | Tennessee (17–1) | Tennessee (18–3) | Clemson (20–2) | Clemson (22–4) | UCF (25–9) | UCF (29–9) | Duke (30–10) | Ole Miss (31–6) | Duke (34–10) | Ole Miss (34–19) | Ole Miss (34–20) | Notre Dame (33–15) | 23. |
| 24. | Kentucky | South Carolina (0–0) | UCF (6–1) | Georgia (9–2) | Texas State (10–3) | Baylor (15–4) | Baylor (17–5) | Tennessee (23–5) | Wichita State (24–5) | Georgia (25–8) | Ole Miss (28–15) | UCF (34–12–1) | Notre Dame (28–12) | Notre Dame (31–12) | Minnesota (29–11) | Wichita State (41–13–1) | 24. |
| 25. | South Carolina | Duke (4–0) | South Carolina (2–1) | Clemson (9–2) | Clemson (13–2) | Clemson (16–2) | UCF (19–6) | Texas A&M (23–5) | Georgia (23–6) | Texas State (25–6) | UCF (30–12–1) | Notre Dame (26–12) | James Madison (30–1) | James Madison (31–1) | Wichita State (39–11–1) | Liberty (44–15) | 25. |
| | Preseason Jan 18 | Week 1 Feb 15 | Week 2 Feb 22 | Week 3 Mar 1 | Week 4 Mar 7 | Week 5 Mar 15 | Week 6 Mar 22 | Week 7 Mar 29 | Week 8 Apr 5 | Week 9 Apr 12 | Week 10 Apr 19 | Week 11 Apr 26 | Week 12 May 3 | Week 13 May 10 | Week 14 May 18 | Final Jun 14 | |
| | | Dropped: No. 22 UCF | Dropped: No. 18 Georgia; No. 23 Tennessee | Dropped: No. 18 Mississippi State; No. 19 Minnesota; No. 23 Baylor; No. 25 South Carolina | Dropped: No. 20 Iowa State; No. 23 Oregon State | Dropped: No. 25 Michigan | None | Dropped: No. 17 Georgia | Dropped: No. 21 Baylor; No. 25 Texas A&M | Dropped: No. 22 Northwestern | Dropped: No. 24 Georgia; No. 25 Texas State | Dropped: No. 20 Wichita State | Dropped: No. 24 UCF | None | Dropped: No. 24 Notre Dame | Dropped: No. 14 Louisiana; No. 23 Ole Miss; No. 24 Minnesota | |

== Softball America ==
| | Preseason Feb 1 | Week 1 Feb 16 | Week 2 Feb 23 | Week 3 Mar 2 | Week 4 Mar 9 | Week 5 Mar 16 | Week 6 Mar 23 | Week 7 Mar 30 | Week 8 Apr 6 | Week 9 Apr 13 | Week 10 Apr 20 | Week 11 Apr 27 | Week 12 May 4 | Week 13 May 11 | Week 14 May 18 | Week 15 May 25 | Final Jun 15 | |
|---|---|---|---|---|---|---|---|---|---|---|---|---|---|---|---|---|---|---|
| 1. | UCLA | UCLA (1–0) | UCLA (5–0) | Oklahoma (12–0) | Oklahoma (17–0) | Oklahoma (22–0) | Oklahoma (22–0) | Oklahoma (25–0) | Oklahoma (28–0) | Oklahoma (30–0) | Oklahoma (33–0) | Oklahoma (37–1) | Oklahoma (39–1) | Oklahoma (42–2) | Oklahoma (45–2) | Oklahoma (48–2) | Oklahoma (56–4) | 1. |
| 2. | Arizona | Oklahoma (4–0) | Oklahoma (7–0) | UCLA (8–1) | UCLA (10–1) | UCLA (15–1) | UCLA (19–1) | UCLA (19–1) | UCLA (19–1) | UCLA (22–2) | UCLA (25–2) | UCLA (28–3) | UCLA (32–3) | UCLA (38–3) | UCLA (41–4) | UCLA (44–4) | Florida State (49–13–1) | 2. |
| 3. | Washington | Washington (5–0) | Arizona (5–0) | Arizona (10–0) | Oregon (13–1) | Oregon (16–1) | Oregon (20–1) | Oregon (23–1) | Washington (28–4) | Florida (30–4) | Washington (34–6) | Alabama (36–7) | Alabama (39–7) | Florida (40–8) | Alabama (45–7) | Alabama (48–7) | Alabama (52–9) | 3. |
| 4. | LSU | Arizona (0–0) | Alabama (8–0) | Alabama (14–0) | Arizona (12–1) | Alabama (22–1) | Alabama (24–2) | Florida (24–3) | Oregon (26–2) | Washington (31–5) | Florida (32–6) | Florida (35–7) | Florida (37–8) | Alabama (42–7) | Florida (42–9) | Florida (45–9) | James Madison (41–4) | 4. |
| 5. | Oklahoma | Florida (2–0) | Florida (8–0) | Florida (12–0) | Arizona State (15–1) | Florida (17–2) | Florida (21–2) | Texas (24–3) | Florida (27–4) | Oregon (27–5) | Oregon (28–8) | Washington (35–9) | Washington (35–9) | Washington (39–9) | Oklahoma State (42–9) | Oklahoma State (45–9) | UCLA (47–7) | 5. |
| 6. | Florida | Alabama (4–0) | Washington (9–1) | Texas (8–0) | Florida (14–1) | Arizona State (17–2) | Washington (22–2) | Alabama (26–4) | Texas (27–3) | Texas (31–3) | Alabama (33–7) | Oregon (30–10) | Oklahoma State (39–6) | Oklahoma State (40–8) | Arkansas (40–9) | Arkansas (43–9) | Oklahoma State (48–12) | 6. |
| 7. | Texas | LSU (2–1) | Texas (2–0) | Arizona State (11–1) | Alabama (19–1) | Arizona (14–3) | Texas (20–3) | Washington (24–4) | Alabama (29–4) | Alabama (31–5) | Florida State (31–6) | Florida State (33–7–1) | Arkansas (40–8) | Arkansas (40–8) | Washington (41–11) | Washington (45–12) | Arizona (41–15) | 7. |
| 8. | Louisiana | Texas (0–0) | Louisiana (4–0) | Washington (13–2) | Oklahoma State (18–1) | Washington (20–2) | Arizona State (17–6) | Arizona (18–5) | Arizona (22–5) | Arizona (24–5) | Oklahoma State (35–5) | Oklahoma State (36–5) | Florida State (36–8–1) | Oregon (33–15) | Oregon (37–15) | Missouri (41–15) | Georgia (34–23) | 8. |
| 9. | Alabama | Louisiana (0–0) | Arizona State (6–0) | Oklahoma State (13–1) | Washington (16–2) | Oklahoma State (20–2) | Arizona (14–5) | Arizona State (19–8) | Florida State (24–6) | Florida State (27–6) | Texas (31–6) | Texas (35–6) | Arizona State (31–12) | Arizona (35–10) | Arizona (36–13) | Arizona (39–13) | Florida (45–11) | 9. |
| 10. | Arizona State | Arizona State (4–0) | Virginia Tech (7–2) | Oregon (9–1) | Texas (10–2) | Texas (15–2) | Oklahoma State (23–4) | Kentucky (25–4) | Arkansas (31–3) | Oklahoma State (32–5) | Arkansas (36–5) | Arkansas (38–7) | Oregon (31–13) | Florida State (38–9–1) | Missouri (38–15) | Florida State (42–10–1) | Arkansas (43–11) | 10. |
| 11. | Oklahoma State | Oklahoma State (2–0) | Oklahoma State (7–0) | Virginia Tech (7–2) | Virginia Tech (7–2) | Florida State (13–5) | Florida State (16–6) | Florida State (20–6) | Kentucky (27–6) | Arkansas (33–5) | Arizona State (28–11) | Arizona State (28–11) | Arizona (33–8) | Arizona State (32–14) | Florida State (39–10–1) | Texas (42–12) | Washington (45–14) | 11. |
| 12. | Florida State | Virginia Tech (3–0) | Oregon (7–0) | Louisiana (9–3) | Florida State (11–4) | LSU (15–7) | LSU (18–8) | Arkansas (28–3) | Oklahoma State (29–5) | Virginia Tech (25–6) | Arizona (27–8) | Arizona (31–8) | Texas (35–9) | Texas (38–9) | Duke (42–10) | Virginia Tech (36–13) | Missouri (42–17) | 12. |
| 13. | Virginia Tech | Florida State (3–1) | LSU (5–3) | Florida State (10–3) | LSU (13–6) | Virginia Tech (10–3) | Virginia Tech (15–4) | Oklahoma State (26–5) | Arizona State (21–9) | Kentucky (28–8) | Virginia Tech (28–7) | Clemson (37–4) | Clemson (37–4) | Clemson (40–5) | Arizona State (32–14) | LSU (35–20) | Texas (43–14) | 13. |
| 14. | Oregon | Oregon (5–0) | Florida State (7–3) | Kentucky (14–0) | Kentucky (19–0) | Arkansas (20–2) | Arkansas (23–3) | Virginia Tech (19–5) | Virginia Tech (23–6) | Arizona State (25–10) | Louisiana (34–7) | Missouri (34–11) | Missouri (35–13) | Missouri (37–14) | Clemson (42–6) | Kentucky (43–14) | Virginia Tech (37–15) | 14. |
| 15. | Georgia | Missouri (3–1) | Kentucky (9–0) | LSU (10–5) | Arkansas (16–2) | Kentucky (20–2) | Kentucky (23–2) | LSU (18–11) | Missouri (28–7) | Louisiana (32–6) | Kentucky (30–10) | Louisiana (35–9) | Louisiana (38–9) | Kentucky (38–12) | Texas (39–11) | Oregon (40–17) | LSU (35–22) | 15. |
| 16. | Arkansas | Mississippi State (2–0) | Mississippi State (4–1) | Missouri (12–2) | Louisiana (13–4) | Louisiana (13–4) | Georgia (21–3) | Missouri (24–7) | Louisiana (27–6) | LSU (24–13) | Clemson (32–4) | LSU (28–15) | LSU (29–17) | Virginia Tech (32–12) | Virginia Tech (33–13) | James Madison (37–1) | Kentucky (43–16) | 16. |
| 17. | Missouri | Georgia (2–1) | Missouri (6–2) | Arkansas (11–2) | Missouri (15–4) | Missouri (19–4) | Missouri (20–6) | Louisiana (22–6) | LSU (21–12) | Missouri (29–9) | LSU (26–14) | Kentucky (32–12) | Kentucky (35–12) | Louisiana (40–10) | Louisiana (44–10) | Michigan (38–8) | Oregon (40–17) | 17. |
| 18. | South Carolina | South Carolina (0–0) | Arkansas (5–2) | Mississippi State (8–4) | Tennessee (17–1) | Georgia (19–2) | Duke (24–1) | Tennessee (25–5) | Tennessee (28–6) | Tennessee (29–6) | Missouri (32–10) | Virginia Tech (28–11) | Virginia Tech (31–12) | LSU (31–18) | LSU (32–19) | Louisiana (47–12) | Michigan (38–8) | 18. |
| 19. | Mississippi State | Arkansas (0–1) | Iowa State (9–1) | Iowa State (13–2) | Georgia (14–2) | Duke (19–1) | Tennessee (21–5) | Georgia (22–5) | Clemson (26–4) | Clemson (26–4) | Tennessee (33–7) | Tennessee (35–8) | Tennessee (38–8) | Duke (39–10) | Tennessee (41–13) | Arizona State (33–16) | Louisiana (47–12) | 19. |
| 20. | Michigan | Michigan (0–0) | Michigan (0–0) | Duke (12–1) | Duke (15–1) | Tennessee (18–3) | Louisiana (16–6) | Clemson (22–4) | Georgia (23–7) | Georgia (26–8) | Wichita State (32–5–1) | Georgia (29–14) | Duke (34–10) | Tennessee (39–12) | Kentucky (39–13) | Georgia (32–21) | Arizona State (33–16) | 20. |
| 21. | Kentucky | Kentucky (3–0) | South Carolina (2–1) | South Carolina (8–2) | UCF (13–3) | UCF (17–3) | Clemson (20–2) | Duke (26–3) | Texas State (24–3) | UCF (29–9) | UCF (30–12–1) | UCF (34–12–1) | Minnesota (25–7) | Michigan (32–6) | Michigan (36–6) | Duke (44–12) | Duke (44–12) | 21. |
| 22. | Minnesota | Minnesota (0–0) | Minnesota (0–0) | Tennessee (12–1) | South Carolina (12–3) | Clemson (16–2) | Texas State (17–3) | Texas State (20–3) | Duke (27–6) | Minnesota (19–5) | Georgia (27–11) | Duke (34–10) | Michigan (28–5) | Notre Dame (31–12) | James Madison (34–1) | Clemson (44–8) | Clemson (44–8) | 22. |
| 23. | Baylor | Baylor (0–0) | Duke (8–1) | UCF (9–2) | Mississippi State (13–5) | Baylor (15–4) | Baylor (17–5) | Baylor (21–5) | Michigan (13–3) | Texas State (25–6) | Minnesota (22–6) | Wichita State (33–9–1) | Wichita State (37–10–1) | Minnesota (26–10) | Minnesota (29–11) | Minnesota (31–13) | Minnesota (31–13) | 23. |
| 24. | Tennessee | Tennessee (2–0) | Baylor (1–1) | Georgia (9–2) | Clemson (13–2) | Texas State (14–3) | South Carolina (17–7) | UCF (24–6) | Northwestern (18–2) | Duke (27–9) | Duke (30–10) | Minnesota (25–7) | Ole Miss (34–16) | James Madison (31–1) | Wichita State (39–11–1) | Wichita State (41–13–1) | Wichita State (41–13–1) | 24. |
| 25. | UCF | Duke (4–0) | Tennessee (7–1) | Michigan (4–2) | Michigan (4–2) | Northwestern (11–1) | Northwestern (11–1) | Northwestern (15–1) | UCF (25–9) | Michigan (16–4) | Michigan (21–4) | Michigan (24–5) | Georgia (29–17) | Wichita State (37–11–1) | Notre Dame (31–13) | Notre Dame (33–15) | Notre Dame (33–15) | 25. |
| | Preseason Feb 1 | Week 1 Feb 16 | Week 2 Feb 23 | Week 3 Mar 2 | Week 4 Mar 9 | Week 5 Mar 16 | Week 6 Mar 23 | Week 7 Mar 30 | Week 8 Apr 6 | Week 9 Apr 13 | Week 10 Apr 20 | Week 11 Apr 27 | Week 12 May 4 | Week 13 May 11 | Week 14 May 18 | Week 15 May 25 | Final Jun 15 | |
| | | Dropped: No. 25 UCF | Dropped: No. 17 Georgia | Dropped: No. 22 Minnesota; No. 24 Baylor | Dropped: No. 19 Iowa State | Dropped: No. 22 South Carolina; No. 23 Mississippi State; No. 25 Michigan | Dropped: No. 21 UCF | Dropped: No. 24 South Carolina | Dropped: No. 23 Baylor | Dropped: No. 24 Northwestern | Dropped: No. 23 Texas State | None | Dropped: No. 21 UCF | Dropped: No. 24 Ole Miss; No. 25 Georgia | None | Dropped: No. 23 Minnesota | None | |
