= 2021 Clemson Tigers softball team =

American college softball season

2021 Clemson Tigers softball
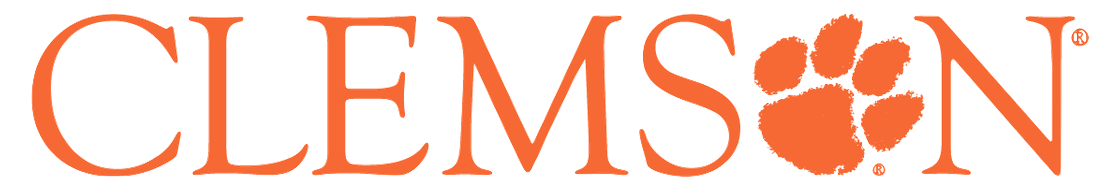

ACC regular-season champions

NCAA tournament, 2–2
- Conference: Atlantic Coast Conference

Ranking
- Coaches: No. 18
- Record: 44–8 (29–5 ACC)
- Head coach: John Rittman (2nd season)
- Assistant coaches: Kyle Jamieson; Courtney Breault
- Home stadium: McWhorter Stadium

2021 Atlantic Coast Conference softball standings
	Conf.						Overall
Team	W		L		T	PCT	W		L		T	PCT
No. 18 Clemson ‍†‍‍^{y}	29	–	5	–	0	.853	44	–	8	–	0	.846
No. 2 Florida State ‍‍‍^{y}	26	–	5	–	1	.828	49	–	12	–	1	.798
No. 20 Duke ‍‍‡‍^{y}	26	–	10	–	0	.722	44	–	12	–	0	.786
No. 14 Virginia Tech ‍‍‍^{y}	23	–	11	–	0	.676	37	–	15	–	0	.712
Notre Dame ‍‍‍^{y}	20	–	10	–	0	.667	33	–	15	–	0	.688
Louisville ‍‍‍	15	–	21	–	1	.419	21	–	28	–	1	.430
NC State ‍‍‍	15	–	22	–	0	.405	26	–	25	–	0	.510
Syracuse ‍‍‍	12	–	20	–	0	.375	20	–	24	–	0	.455
Georgia Tech ‍‍‍	11	–	19	–	0	.367	20	–	26	–	0	.435
North Carolina ‍‍‍	10	–	19	–	0	.345	14	–	26	–	0	.350
Pittsburgh ‍‍‍	12	–	24	–	0	.333	17	–	29	–	0	.370
Virginia ‍‍‍	10	–	27	–	0	.270	15	–	33	–	0	.313
Boston College ‍‍‍	8	–	24	–	0	.250	13	–	32	–	0	.289
† – Conference champion ‡ – Tournament champion y – Invited to the NCAA tournament As of June 15, 2021; Rankings from NFCA/USA Today

The 2021 Clemson Tigers softball team is the varsity college softball team that represented Clemson University during the 2021 NCAA Division I softball season. This was the second season of Clemson's softball program. The Tigers competed in the Atlantic Coast Conference (ACC) and were led by head coach John Rittman. Clemson played its home games at McWhorter Stadium in Clemson, South Carolina.

The Tigers finished their first full season as a program 44–8 and 29–5 in ACC play to finish in first place and claim the regular season championship. As the first seed in the ACC tournament, they defeated Georgia Tech and Virginia Tech before losing to Duke in the Final. They earned an at-large bid to the NCAA tournament and were placed into the Tuscaloosa Regional. There they defeated Troy twice, but lost to Alabama twice to end their season.

The team was led by Valerie Cagle who finished with 28 wins and 15 home runs. Cagle was named to the USA Softball Collegiate Player of the Year top 10 finalist list. She also won ACC Player and Freshman of the year while head coach John Rittman was named ACC Coach of the Year. Cagle and outfielder McKenzie Clark were named to the National Fast Pitch Coaches Association All-Region Southeast teams, with Cagle being named to the first team and Clark being named to the second team. Cagle would later be selected to the NFCA All-American Second Team, marking Clemson's first All-American in program history.

== Previous season ==
The 2020 season was impacted by the coronavirus pandemic. On March 12, it was announced that the 2020 NCAA tournament would be canceled due to the pandemic. Clemson University suspended all events until April 5, 2020. On March 17, the ACC cancelled all spring athletic activities and thereby ended the softball season. The Tigers finished the season 19–8 and 5–1 in ACC play.

== Personnel ==
=== Roster ===
2021 Clemson Tigers roster
Pitchers: 10 – Emma Whitfield – (redshirt) Freshman; 17 – Regan Spencer – Freshman; 34 – Logan Caymol – (redshirt) Freshman; Utility: 9 – Sarah Howell (C/UTL) – Freshman; 12 – Cammy Pereira (INF/OF) – (redshirt) Junior; 15 – Madison May (INF/OF) – (redshirt) Freshman; 19 – Jaden Cheek (INF/UTL) – Freshman; 24 – Arielle Oda (INF/OF) – (redshirt) Freshman; 25 – Marissa Guimbarda (OF/UTL) – (redshirt) Junior; 26 – Carsten Puckett (P/IF) – Freshman; 27 – Grace Mattimore (C/UTL) – (redshirt) Junior; 72 – Valerie Cagle (P/UTL) – (redshirt) Freshman; 87 – Millie Thompson (P/INF) – Freshman	Catchers: 13 – Abi Stuart – (redshirt) Freshman; 23 – JoJo Hyatt – (redshirt) Freshman; Outfielders: 6 – Carlee Shannon – (redshirt) Freshman; 7 – McKenzie Clark – Freshman; 16 – Alia Logoleo – (redshirt) Freshman; 42 – Morgan Johnson – (redshirt) Freshman; Infielders: 2 – Casey Bigham – (redshirt) Senior; 3 – Ansley Houston – Freshman; 8 – Ansley Gilstrap – (redshirt) Senior; 18 – Bailey Taylor – (redshirt) Junior; 58 – Kyah Keller – (redshirt) Freshman; 77 – Hannah Goodwin – (redshirt) Freshman

=== Coaches ===
2021 Clemson Tigers softball coaching staff
- John Rittman – Head coach – 2nd season
- Kyle Jamieson – Assistant coach – 2nd season
- Courtney Breault – Assistant coach – 2nd season
- Reese Jacobs – Volunteer assistant coach – 2nd season

== Schedule ==
Legend
	Clemson win
	Clemson loss
	Cancellation
**Bold**	Clemson team member
*	Non-Conference game
†	Make-Up Game

2021 Clemson Tigers softball game log
Regular season

February (9–2)
Date	Opponent	Site/stadium	Score	Win	Loss	Save	Attendance	Overall record	ACC record
Feb 12	vs Illinois State*	Pruitt Softball Complex • Jacksonville, FL	**W** 11–0 (5)	**Cagle** (1–0)	Leonard (0–1)	—	50	1–0	–
Feb 12	vs North Florida*	Pruitt Softball Complex • Jacksonville, FL	**W** 4–3	**Spencer** (1–0)	Dyhr (0–1)	**Cagle** (1)	59	2–0	–
Feb 13	vs Illinois State*	Pruitt Softball Complex • Jacksonville, FL	Canceled						
Feb 14	at Jacksonville*	Pruitt Softball Complex • Jacksonville, FL	Canceled						
Feb 18	No. 14 Virginia Tech	McWhorter Stadium • Clemson, SC	**W** 8–1	**Cagle** (2–0)	Rochard (2–1)	—	234	3–0	1–0
Feb 19	No. 14 Virginia Tech	McWhorter Stadium • Clemson, SC	**L** 0–9 (5)	Rosenberry (2–0)	**Cagle** (2–1)	None	372	3–1	1–1
Feb 19	No. 14 Virginia Tech	McWhorter Stadium • Clemson, SC	**L** 1–4	Rochard (3–1)	**Thompson** (0–1)	**None**	372	3–2	1–2
Feb 20	at Georgia Tech	Shirley Clements Mewborn Field • Atlanta, GA	**W** 5–2	**Cagle** (3–1)	Neleman (3–2)	None	88	4–2	2–2
Feb 21	at Georgia Tech	Shirley Clements Mewborn Field • Atlanta, GA	**W** 5–3	**Spencer** (2–0)	McPherson (0–2)	**Thompson** (1)	88	5–2	3–2
Feb 21	at Georgia Tech	Shirley Clements Mewborn Field • Atlanta, GA	**W** 5–4	**Cagle** (4–1)	Ray (1–1)	None	88	6–2	4–2
Feb 27	Elon*	McWhorter Stadium • Clemson, SC	**W** 3–0	**Cagle** (5–1)	Quinn (2–1)	None	372	7–2	4–2
Feb 27	Elon	McWhorter Stadium • Clemson, SC	**W** 10–0 (5)	**Spencer** (3–0)	Nemeth (0–1)	None	372	8–2	4–2
Feb 28	Elon	McWhorter Stadium • Clemson, SC	**W** 8–0 (5)	**Cagle** (6–1)	McKenzie (0–1)	None	372	9–2	4–2

March (13–2)
Date	Rank	Opponent	Site/stadium	Score	Win	Loss	Save	Attendance	Overall record	ACC record
Mar 5		at Virginia	Palmer Park • Charlottesville, VA	**W** 9–1 (5)	**Cagle** (7–1)	Murphy (1–1)	None	117	10–2	5–2
Mar 6		at Virginia	Palmer Park • Charlottesville, VA	**W** 5–3	**Whitfield** (1–0)	Wooten (1–1)	**Cagle** (2)	0	11–2	6–2
Mar 6		at Virginia	Palmer Park • Charlottesville, VA	**W** 4–2	**Spencer** (4–0)	Grube (0–1)	**Cagle** (3)	145	12–2	7–2
Mar 7		at Virginia	Palmer Park • Charlottesville, VA	**W** 8–1	**Cagle** (8–1)	Houge (2–2)	None	148	13–2	8–2
Mar 12	No. 25	Furman*	McWhorter Stadium • Clemson, SC	**W** 8–0 (6)	**Cagle** (9–1)	Tufts (3–4)	None	372	14–2	8–2
Mar 13	No. 25	Furman*	McWhorter Stadium • Clemson, SC	**W** 5–0	**Thompson** (1–1)	Tufts (3–5)	None	372	15–2	8–2
Mar 13	No. 25	Furman*	McWhorter Stadium • Clemson, SC	**W** 8–1	**Cagle** (10–1)	Basso (0–3)	None	372	16–2	8–2
Mar 19	No. 23	at Louisville	Ulmer Stadium • Louisville, KY	**W** 4–0 (11)	**Cagle** (11–1)	Leonhardt (0–3)	None	134	17–2	9–2
Mar 20	No. 23	at Louisville	Ulmer Stadium • Louisville, KY	**W** 2–1	**Thompson** (2–1)	Roby (5–4)	None	0	18–2	10–2
Mar 20	No. 23	at Louisville	Ulmer Stadium • Louisville, KY	**W** 6–1	**Spencer** (5–0)	Holloway (3–3)	None	234	19–2	11–2
Mar 21	No. 23	at Louisville	Ulmer Stadium • Louisville, KY	**W** 4–2	**Cagle** (12–1)	Roby (5–5)	None	317	20–2	12–2
Mar 26	No. 20	No. 11 Duke	McWhorter Stadium • Clemson, SC	**L** 0–2	St. George (11–0)	**Cagle** (12–2)	None	372	20–3	12–3
Mar 26	No. 20	No. 11 Duke	McWhorter Stadium • Clemson, SC	**L** 1–3	Walters (10–0)	**Cagle** (12–3)	None	372	20–4	12–4
Mar 27	No. 20	No. 11 Duke	McWhorter Stadium • Clemson, SC	**W** 4–1	**Cagle** (13–3)	St. George (11–1)	None	372	21–4	13–4
Mar 28	No. 20	No. 11 Duke	McWhorter Stadium • Clemson, SC	**W** 4–2	**Thompson** (3–1)	Walters (10–1)	**Cagle** (4)	372	22–4	14–4

April (15–0)
Date	Rank	Opponent	Site/stadium	Score	Win	Loss	Save	Attendance	Overall record	ACC record
Apr 1	No. 18	North Carolina	McWhorter Stadium • Clemson, SC	**W** 4–1	**Cagle** (14–3)	Pickett (8–5)	None	372	23–4	15–4
Apr 2	No. 18	North Carolina	McWhorter Stadium • Clemson, SC	**W** 6–1	**Thompson** (4–1)	Pickett (8–6)	None	372	24–4	16–4
Apr 2	No. 18	North Carolina	McWhorter Stadium • Clemson, SC	**W** 12–1 (5)	**Cagle** (15–3)	Olinger (0–2)	'None	372	25–4	17–4
Apr 3	No. 18	North Carolina	McWhorter Stadium • Clemson, SC	**W** 9–1 (6)	**Cagle** (16–3)	Olinger (0–3)	None	372	26–4	18–4
Apr 9	No. 18	at Notre Dame	Melissa Cook Stadium • Notre Dame, IN	Postponed due to COVID-19						
Apr 10	No. 18	at Notre Dame	Melissa Cook Stadium • Notre Dame, IN	Postponed due to COVID-19						
Apr 10	No. 18	at Notre Dame	Melissa Cook Stadium • Notre Dame, IN	Postponed due to COVID-19						
Apr 11	No. 18	at Notre Dame	Melissa Cook Stadium • Notre Dame, IN	Postponed due to COVID-19						
Apr 13	No. 17	Winthrop*	McWhorter Stadium • Clemson, SC	**W** 9–0 (5)	**Cagle** (17–3)	Watson (11–9)	None	372	27–4	18–4
Apr 13	No. 17	Winthrop*	McWhorter Stadium • Clemson, SC	**W** 6–2	**Thompson** (5–1)	Weixlmann (7–7)	None	372	28–4	18–4
Apr 16	No. 17	Boston College	McWhorter Stadium • Clemson, SC	**W** 6–0	**Cagle** (18–3)	Anderson (5–12)	None	372	29–4	19–4
Apr 17	No. 17	Boston College	McWhorter Stadium • Clemson, SC	**W** 10–2 (6)	**Thompson** (6–1)	Anderson (5–13)	None	372	30–4	20–4
Apr 17	No. 17	Boston College	McWhorter Stadium • Clemson, SC	**W** 4–3 (9)	**Cagle** (19–3)	Anderson (5–14)	None	372	31–4	21–4
Apr 18	No. 17	Boston College	McWhorter Stadium • Clemson, SC	**W** 6–0	**Cagle** (20–3)	Schnackenberg (2–1)	None	372	32–4	22–4
Apr 21	No. 16	at South Carolina*	Beckham Field • Columbia, SC	**W** 6–0	**Cagle** (21–3)	Drotar (3–6)	None	400	33–4	22–4
Apr 23	No. 16	NC State	McWhorter Stadium • Clemson, SC	**W** 9–3	**Cagle** (22–3)	Czech (3–3)	None	474	34–4	23–4
Apr 23	No. 16	NC State	McWhorter Stadium • Clemson, SC	**W** 4–3	**Spencer** (6–0)	Nester (7–7)	None	474	35–4	24–4
Apr 25	No. 16	NC State	McWhorter Stadium • Clemson, SC	**W** 4–3	**Cagle** (23–3)	Trahan (11–6)	None	474	36–4	25–4
Apr 25	No. 16	NC State	McWhorter Stadium • Clemson, SC	**W** 4–3	**Thompson** (7–1)	Czech (3–4)	**Cagle** (5)	474	37–4	26–4

May (3–1)
Date	Rank	Opponent	Site/stadium	Score	Win	Loss	Save	Attendance	Overall record	ACC record
May 7	No. 13	at Syracuse	Skytop Softball Stadium • Syracuse, NY	**W** 4–2	**Cagle** (24–3)	Romero (7–9)	None	23	38–4	27–4
May 8	No. 13	at Syracuse	Skytop Softball Stadium • Syracuse, NY	**W** 4–2	**Thompson** (8–1)	Hendrix (3–3)	**Spencer** (1)	24	39–4	28–4
May 8	No. 13	at Syracuse	Skytop Softball Stadium • Syracuse, NY	**L** 6–7	Romero (8–9)	**Cagle** (24–4)	None	24	39–5	28–5
May 9	No. 13	at Syracuse	Skytop Softball Stadium • Syracuse, NY	**W** 19–2	**Thompson** (9–1)	Oliver (7–10)	None	29	40–5	28–5

Postseason

ACC tournament (2–1)
Date	Seed	Rank	Opponent	Opponent Seed	Site/stadium	Score	Win	Loss	Save	Attendance	Overall record	Tournament record
May 13	1	No. 13	Georgia Tech	9	Ulmer Stadium • Louisville, KY	**W** 2–0	**Cagle** (25–4)	Neleman (12–8)	None	276	41–5	1–0
May 14	1	No. 13	No. 20 Virginia Tech	4	Ulmer Stadium • Louisville, KY	**W** 2–0	**Cagle** (26–4)	Rochard (25–8)	None	328	42–5	2–0
May 15	1	No. 13	No. 21 Duke	3	Ulmer Stadium • Louisville, KY	**L** 0–1	Walters (17–3)	**Cagle** (26–5)	St. George (4)	485	42–6	2–1

NCAA Tuscaloosa Regional (2–2)
Date	Opponent Seed	Opponent	Seed	Rank	Site/stadium	Score	Win	Loss	Save	Attendance	Overall record	NCAA Tuscaloosa Regional Record
May 21	3	vs. Troy	2	No. 13	Rhoads Stadium • Tuscaloosa, AL	**W** 8–0 (5)	**Cagle** (27–5)	Leanna (20–8)	None	2,912	43–6	1–0
May 22	1	at No. 3 Alabama	2	No. 13	Rhoads Stadium • Tuscaloosa, AL	**L** 0–6	Fouts (23–3)	**Cagle** (27–6)	None	2,987	43–7	1–1
May 22	3	vs. Troy	2	No. 13	Rhoads Stadium • Tuscaloosa, AL	**W** 4–2	**Cagle** (28–6)	Baker (7–6)	None	2,987	44–7	2–1
May 23	1	at No. 3 Alabama	2	No. 13	Rhoads Stadium • Tuscaloosa, AL	**L** 0–5	Fouts (24–3)	**Cagle** (28–7)	None	3,044	44–8	2–2

Note: All rankings shown are from the NFCA/USA Today poll.

== Rankings ==
Ranking movements Legend: ██ Increase in ranking ██ Decrease in ranking — = Not ranked RV = Received votes т = Tied with team above or below
	Week																
Poll	Pre	1	2	3	4	5	6	7	8	9	10	11	12	13	14	15	Final
NFCA / USA Today	—	RV	RV	RV	25	23	20	18	18	17	16	13т	13	13	13	13*	18
Softball America	—	—	—	—	24	22	21	20	19	19	16	13	13	13	14	22	22
ESPN.com/USA Softball	—	RV	RV	RV	RV	25	25	19	18	18	16	13	11	10	10	10*	17
D1Softball	—	—	—	25	25	25	23	23	20	19	18	15	15	16	17	17*	19

* Softball America released a poll on May 25, 2021, during the NCAA tournament while all other polls did not release a poll. Pre-tournament rankings for NCFA, USA, and D1 Softball are shown for week 15 rankings.
