= Kristin Vesely =

American softball coach

Biographical details
- Born: February 7, 1984 (age 42); Phoenix, Arizona, U.S.

Playing career
- 2003–2006: Oklahoma
- 2006–2007: New England Riptide

Coaching career (HC unless noted)
- 2010: Blanchard HS (OK)
- 2011–2014: Houston (asst.)
- 2015–2016: Houston (assoc. HC)
- 2017–2025: Houston

Head coaching record
- Overall: 233–218–1 (.517)

Kristin Marie Vesely (born February 7, 1984) is an American softball coach and former outfielder. She most recently served as the head softball coach at the University of Houston. As a player, she earned All-American honors while playing collegiate softball at the University of Oklahoma.

== Coaching career ==
=== Houston ===
On June 10, 2016, Kristin Vesely was announced as the new head coach of the Houston softball program. She was promoted to the role of head coach after serving as associate head coach for 2 years. In 2019, Vesely lead the Cougars to the finals of the Austin Regional to play Texas, where they lost both games.

== Statistics ==
Oklahoma Sooners
YEAR	G	AB	R	H	BA	RBI	HR	3B	2B	TB	SLG	BB	SO	SB	SBA
2003	59	179	33	46	.257	13	2	1	4	58	.324%	13	26	4	11
2004	68	211	35	65	.308	17	0	4	14	87	.412%	22	24	15	19
2005	67	215	63	97	.451	31	2	2	18	131	.665%	21	13	32	35
2006	62	193	54	85	.440	49	5	3	17	123	.637%	28	14	11	13
TOTALS	256	798	185	293	.367	110	9	10	53	393	.492%	84	77	62	78

== Head coaching record ==
=== College ===
Record table
Season	Team	Overall	Conference	Standing	Postseason
Houston Cougars (American Athletic Conference) (2017–2023)
2017	Houston	30–25	12–6	2nd	
2018	Houston	37–22	13–8	2nd	NCAA Regional
2019	Houston	39–19	12–8	3rd	NCAA Regional
2020	Houston	16–7	—	—	Season cancelled due to the COVID-19 pandemic
2021	Houston	17–33	8–16	4th	
2022	Houston	27–27–1	8–9–1	4th	
2023	Houston	20–30	7–10	5th	
Houston Cougars (Big 12 Conference) (2024–2025)
2024	Houston	25–30	4–23	10th	
2025	Houston	22–25	4–18	11th	
Houston:		233–218–1 (.517)	68–98–1 (.410)		
Total:		233–218–1 (.517)			
