= Giselle Juarez (softball) =

American softball player

Biographical details
- Born: March 23, 1998 (age 28); Glendale, Arizona, U.S.

Playing career
- 2017–2018: Arizona State
- 2019: Oklahoma
- Position: Pitcher

Coaching career (HC unless noted)
- 2024–present: UConn (Asst.)

Accomplishments and honors

Awards
- National Champion (2021); Women's College World Series Most Outstanding Player (2021); Softball America Pitcher of the Year (2019); Big 12 Pitcher of the Year (2019); All-Pac 12 First Team (2018); All-Big 12 First Team (2019)
Medal record
Women's softball
Representing Puerto Rico
Central American and Caribbean Games
Gold medal – first place	2026 Santo Domingo	Team

Giselle "G" Lizette Juarez-Presley (born March 23, 1998) is an American, former collegiate All-American softball pitcher. She played college softball at Oklahoma and Arizona State. She is currently an assistant coach for UConn.

== Early life ==
Juarez attended Mountain Ridge High School in Glendale, Arizona, where she finished her career with a 1.78 earned run average (ERA), 371 strikeouts and a .168 opponent batting average. She led her team to back-to-back state championship appearances in 2014 and 2015, including Mountain Ridge's first state championship appearance in 2014. She was ranked No. 45 by FloSoftball in the 2016 class.

== College career ==
=== Freshman year ===
Juarez began her collegiate career at Arizona State. As a freshman, she recorded a 2.79 ERA in 90 1/3 innings, with 81 strikeouts, and 30 walks. She recorded a season-best 11 strikeouts against Illinois State on February 17, 2017. Following the season, she was named All-Pac 12 honorable mention.

=== Sophomore year ===
During her sophomore year, Juarez posted a 26–6 record, with a 1.21 ERA, and 305 strikeouts in 224 1/3 innings. She allowed just 39 runs on 91 hits, and was one of just nine NCAA Division I pitchers to reach the 300-strikeout threshold. She ranked third nationally with 13 shutouts. Her 1.21 ERA ranked 13th nationally, and was the fourth lowest ERA among pitchers who threw 200 or more innings on the season. She earned Pac-12 Pitcher of the Week honors for four-consecutive weeks, becoming just the second player in program history to accomplish the feat. She threw her first career no-hitter on March 30, 2018, against BYU. Following an outstanding season, she was named a top ten finalist for USA Softball Collegiate Player of the Year, first-team All-Pac 12 and NFCA first-team All-American.

=== Junior year ===
During her junior year, Juarez transferred to Oklahoma. She made 39 appearances, including 32 starts, and finished the regular season undefeated with a 21–0 record. She threw her first career perfect game on March 14, 2019, in a 14–0 win against Loyola Marymount. She threw her second perfect game on April 28, 2019, in a 14–0 win against Iowa State, becoming the second player in program history to throw multiple perfect games in a season, following Paige Parker in 2015.

She finished the season with 15 complete games, including seven shutouts, while combining on seven more. She ranked third nationally in hits allowed per seven innings pitched (3.64), fourth in strikeout-to-walk ratio (7.08), sixth in strikeouts per seven innings (10.1), 10th in strikeouts (269) and 16th in ERA (1.39). Her opponent batting average (.151) ranked second in Oklahoma single-season history while her 0.72 WHIP ranked third, 10.11 strikeouts per seven innings ranked fifth. During the 2019 NCAA Division I softball tournament, she threw six complete games including three shutouts, to help lead her team to the championship game, where they lost to UCLA. Following an outstanding season, she was named a top ten finalist for USA Softball Collegiate Player of the Year, Big 12 Pitcher of the Year, Softball America Pitcher of the Year, first-team All-Big 12 and NFCA first-team All-American.

=== Senior year ===
During her senior year, she battled injury throughout the 2020 season, making five appearances, including two starts, and pitched a combined 6 2/3 innings. She finished the season with a 2–1 record, with nine strikeouts and four walks in a season that was cancelled due to the COVID-19 pandemic. She underwent biceps surgery on March 6, 2020.

=== Redshirt senior year ===
During her redshirt senior year, Juarez posted a 23–1 record, with a 2.81, ERA and 159 strikeouts in 128 innings pitched. Juarez help lead Oklahoma to the 2021 NCAA Division I softball tournament, where she went 5–0, and posted a 0.90 ERA, with 38 strikeouts during the tournament. During the championship series at the 2021 Women's College World Series, she pitched two complete games in a row for the first time in her career. During game three of the series, she allowed just two hits and notched seven strikeouts in a 5–1 victory over Florida State to win the national championship, and was subsequently named Most Outstanding Player.

== Coaching career ==
On June 20, 2024, she was named an assistant coach for the UConn Huskies softball team.

== International career ==
Juarez represented the United States at the 2017 Junior Women's Softball World Championship where she posted a 5–0 record, with 28 strikeouts in 25 2/3 innings, while allowing just 10 runs on 17 hits, helping lead the USA to a gold medal.

She represented Puerto Rico at the 2026 Central American and Caribbean Games.
