= Houston Cougars softball =

- Founded: 2001; 25 years ago
- University: University of Houston
- Head coach: Chrissy Schoonmaker (1st season)
- Conference: Big 12
- Location: Houston, Texas, US
- Home stadium: Cougar Softball Stadium (capacity: 1,200)
- Nickname: Cougars
- Colors: Scarlet and white

NCAA super regional appearances
- 2008, 2011

NCAA Tournament appearances
- 2004, 2007, 2008, 2011, 2012, 2013, 2014, 2018, 2019

Conference tournament championships
- 2007

Regular-season conference championships
- 2007, 2008, 2011

The Houston Cougars softball team is the college softball team of the University of Houston. The team is a member of the Big 12 Conference as a Division I team. Their home games are played at Cougar Softball Stadium on-campus. The team was established in 2001, and was the regular season champion of Conference USA three times.

Until their permanent home field was completed near the end of their inaugural season, the Cougars played their home games at Baseball USA, a complex in West Houston.

== Conference affiliations ==
- Conference USA (2001–2013)
- American Athletic Conference (2014–2023)
- Big 12 Conference (2024–present)

== Head coaches ==
Tenure	Coach	Overall Record
2001–2016	Kyla Holas	563–376–1 (.599)
2017–2025	Kristin Vesely	233–218–1 (.517)
2026–present	Chrissy Schoonmaker	20–31 (.392)

Notes: Through 2026 season.

== See also ==
- List of NCAA Division I softball programs
