= Cougar Softball Stadium =

Stadium in Houston, Texas, US

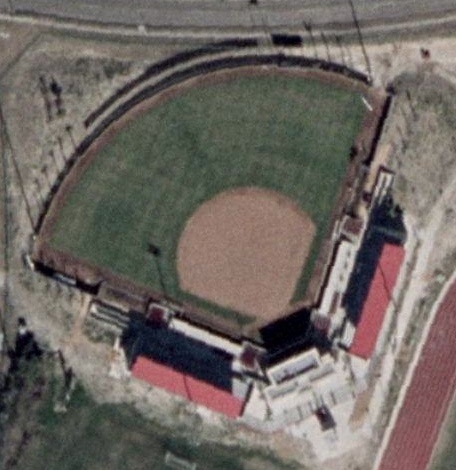
- Interactive map of Cougar Softball Stadium
- Location: Houston, Texas
- Coordinates: 29°43′37″N 95°20′56″W
- Owner: University of Houston System
- Operator: University of Houston
- Capacity: 1,200
- Surface: Grass

Construction
- Opened: 05 May 2001
- Cost: US$2.4 Million

Tenant
- Houston Cougars softball (NCAA) (2001-Present)

Cougar Softball Stadium, formerly known as Cougar Softball Field and Cougar Softball Complex, is the home field for the Houston Cougars softball team located on the campus of the University of Houston in Houston, Texas. Following the majority of the Cougars' inaugural season in 2001, Cougar Softball Stadium was dedicated 5 May 2001. The first game in the stadium was also played that day against the UAB Blazers. While the stadium was playable, it was not fully completed until the next season. The stadium hosted the 2008 Conference USA Softball Championship.
