= American Conference softball tournament =

American college softball tournament

- Conference softball championship
- American Conference logo
- Sport: Softball
- Conference: American Conference
- Number of teams: 10
- Format: Single-elimination tournament
- Current stadium: Joyner Family Softball Stadium
- Current location: Tampa, FL
- Played: 2014–present
- Last contest: 2025
- Current champion: South Florida
- Most championships: Tulsa Golden Hurricane and UCF Knights (3 each)
- Official website: American Softball

Host stadiums
- Max R. Joyner Family Stadium (2026); USF Softball Stadium (2025); Wilkins Stadium (2024); USF Softball Stadium (2023); Max R. Joyner Family Stadium (2022); Collins Family Softball Complex (2021); UCF Softball Stadium (2020, canceled); Cougar Softball Stadium (2019); USF Softball Stadium (2018); ECU Softball Stadium (2017); Collins Family Softball Complex (2016); UCF Softball Complex (2015); Cougar Softball Stadium (2014)

Host locations
- Greenville, NC (2026); Tampa, FL (2025); Wichita, KS (2024); Tampa, FL (2023); Greenville, NC (2022); Tulsa, OK (2021); Orlando, FL (2020, canceled); Houston, TX (2019); Tampa, FL (2018); Greenville, NC (2017); Tulsa, OK (2016); Orlando, FL (2015); Houston, TX (2014)

The American Conference softball tournament is the conference championship tournament in college softball for the American Conference. It is a single-elimination tournament, with seeding based on regular season records. The winner receives the conference's automatic bid to the NCAA Division I Softball Championship each season. The conference regular-season champion, as determined by win-loss record, receives the #1 seed in the conference tournament.

The American is one of two successors to the original Big East Conference, which split after the 2013 season. The first year of the tournament was held at Cougar Softball Stadium in Houston, Texas.

== Tournament ==
The American softball tournament is a single-elimination tournament held each year at various American-conference campus stadiums. Ten of the thirteen current all-sport members of the conference sponsor softball. Rice, Temple, and Tulane do not sponsor softball teams.

== Champions ==
=== Year-by-year ===
Year	Champion	Site	MOP
2014	Louisville	Cougar Softball Stadium • Houston, TX	Katie Keller (2B), Louisville
2015	UCF	UCF Softball Complex • Orlando, FL	Samantha McCloskey (C), UCF
2016	Tulsa	Collins Family Softball Complex • Tulsa, OK	Maddie Withee (C), Tulsa
2017	Tulsa	East Carolina Softball Complex • Greenville, NC	Emily Watson (P), Tulsa
2018	Tulsa	USF Softball Stadium • Tampa, FL	Emily Watson (P), Tulsa
2019	No champion (Note: Tournament cancelled during opening round due to inclement weather.)	Cougar Softball Stadium • Houston, TX	
2020	Cancelled due to the coronavirus pandemic		
2021	Wichita State	Collins Family Softball Complex • Tulsa, OK	Addison Barnard (OF), Wichita State
2022	UCF	Max R. Joyner Family Stadium • Greenville, NC	Jada Cody (C/3B), UCF
2023	UCF	USF Softball Stadium • Tampa, FL	Sarah Willis (P), UCF
2024	Charlotte	Wilkins Stadium • Wichita, KS	Addison Barnard (OF), Wichita State
2025	South Florida	USF Softball Stadium • Tampa, FL	Belle Sardja (P), South Florida
2026	South Florida	Max R. Joyner Family Stadium • Greenville, NC	Anne Long (P), South Florida

=== By school ===
School	Championships	Years
Tulsa	3	2016, 2017, 2018
UCF	3	2015, 2022, 2023
South Florida	2	2025, 2026
Charlotte	1	2024
Louisville	1	2014
Wichita State	1	2021
East Carolina	0	
Florida Atlantic	0	
Memphis	0	
UTSA	0	
North Texas	0	
UAB	0	

Italics indicate school no longer sponsors softball in The American.
