= 2016 American Athletic Conference softball tournament =

American college softball tournament

- Teams: 7
- Format: Single-elimination tournament
- Finals site: Collins Family Softball Complex; Tulsa, Oklahoma
- Champions: Tulsa (1st title)
- Winning coach: John Bargfeldt (1st title)
- MVP: Maddie Withee (Tulsa)
- Television: ESPN3; ESPNU

2016 American Athletic Conference softball standings
	Conf.				Overall
Team	W		L	PCT	W		L	PCT
No. 25 South Florida ‍†‍‍^{y}	15	–	3	.833	45	–	16	.738
UCF ‍‍‍^{y}	12	–	4	.750	38	–	22	.633
Tulsa ‍‍‡‍^{y}	9	–	9	.500	35	–	21	.625
Houston ‍‍‍	9	–	9	.500	27	–	29	.482
Memphis ‍‍‍	7	–	11	.389	26	–	31	.456
East Carolina ‍‍‍	5	–	13	.278	23	–	31	.426
UConn ‍‍‍	4	–	12	.250	19	–	33	.365
† – Conference champion ‡ – Tournament champion y – Invited to the NCAA tournament As of May 23, 2016; Rankings from Today/NFCA Coaches

The 2016 American Athletic Conference softball tournament was held at the Collins Family Softball Complex on the campus of the University of Tulsa in Tulsa, Oklahoma from May 12 through May 14, 2016. The event determined the champion of the American Athletic Conference for the 2016 NCAA Division I softball season. Third-seeded Tulsa won the Tournament for the first time and earned the American Athletic Conference's automatic bid to the 2016 NCAA Division I softball tournament. All games were televised; the quarterfinals and semifinals were shown on the American Digital Network while the championship was broadcast on ESPN.

Previous winners of the Tournament were UCF in 2015 and former member Louisville in 2014.

== Format and seeding ==
The conference's seven teams were seeded based on conference winning percentage from the round-robin regular season. The teams then played a single-elimination tournament with the top seed earning a single bye.

Team	W	L	Pct.	GB	Seed
South Florida	15	3	.833	—	1
UCF	12	4	.750	1.5	2
Tulsa	9	9	.500	6	3
Houston	9	9	.500	6	4
Memphis	7	11	.389	8	5
East Carolina	5	13	.278	10	6
UConn	4	12	.250	10	7

== Results ==
=== Bracket ===
Quarterfinals
4	Houston	5
5	Memphis	4
3	Tulsa	2
6	East Carolina	0
2	UCF	3
7	UConn	2

Semifinals
1	South Florida	4
4	Houston	1
3	Tulsa	4
2	UCF	0

Finals
1	South Florida	0
3	Tulsa	4

=== Game results ===
Date	Game	Winner	Score	Loser
May 12	Game 1	(4) Houston	5–4	(5) Memphis
May 12	Game 2	(2) UCF	3–2	(7) UConn
May 12	Game 3	(3) Tulsa	2–0	(6) East Carolina
May 13	Game 4	(1) South Florida	4–1	(4) Houston
May 13	Game 5	(3) Tulsa	4–0	(2) UCF
May 14	Game 6	(3) Tulsa	4–0	(1) South Florida

== All-Tournament Team ==
The following players were named to the All-Tournament Team.<recap />

Name	Pos.	Team
Samantha McCloskey	C	UCF
Shelby Turnier	P	UCF
Savannah Heebner	P	Houston
Courtney Klingler	1B	Houston
Erica Nunn	P	South Florida
Lee Ann Spivey	C	South Florida
Lauren Evans	1B	South Florida
Astin Donovan	LF	South Florida
Morgan Neal	2B	Tulsa
Emily Watson	P	Tulsa
Jocelyn Sheffield	DP	Tulsa
Caitlin Sill	P	Tulsa

=== Most Outstanding Player ===
Caitlin Sill was named Tournament Most Outstanding Player. Sill was a pitcher for Tulsa who earned two wins in the tournament without allowing a run.
