= 2018 American Athletic Conference softball tournament =

American college softball tournament

- Teams: 8
- Format: Single-elimination tournament
- Finals site: USF Softball Stadium; Tampa, Florida
- Champions: Tulsa (3rd title)
- Winning coach: John Bargfeldt (3rd title)
- MVP: Emily Watson (Tulsa)
- Television: ESPN; American Digital Network

2018 American Athletic Conference softball standings
	Conf.				Overall
Team	W		L	PCT	W		L	PCT
South Florida ‍†‍‍^{y}	14	–	7	.667	39	–	23	.629
Houston ‍‍‍^{y}	13	–	8	.619	37	–	22	.627
UCF ‍‍‍	12	–	9	.571	34	–	22	.607
Wichita State ‍‍‍^{y}	12	–	9	.571	32	–	23	.582
Memphis ‍‍‍	10	–	11	.476	37	–	21	.638
Tulsa ‍‍‡‍^{y}	10	–	11	.476	34	–	25	.576
East Carolina ‍‍‍	8	–	13	.381	23	–	32	.418
UConn ‍‍‍	5	–	16	.238	20	–	35	.364
† – Conference champion ‡ – Tournament champion y – Invited to the NCAA tournament As of May 31, 2018; Rankings from USA Today/NFCA Coaches

The 2017 American Athletic Conference softball tournament was held at the USF Softball Stadium on the campus of South Florida in Tampa, Florida, from May 10 through May 12, 2018. The event determined the champion of the American Athletic Conference for the 2018 NCAA Division I softball season. Sixth seeded Tulsa won the Tournament for the third year in a row and claimed the American's automatic bid to the 2018 NCAA Division I softball tournament.

== Format and seeding ==
The conference's eight teams were seeded based on conference winning percentage from the round-robin regular season. The teams then played a single-elimination tournament.

Team	W	L	Pct.	GB	Seed
South Florida	14	7	.667	—	1
Houston	13	8	.619	1	2
Wichita State	12	9	.571	2	3
UCF	12	9	.571	2	4
Memphis	10	11	4	.476	5
Tulsa	10	11	4	.476	6
East Carolina	8	13	6	.381	7
UConn	5	16	.238	9	8

== Results ==
=== Bracket ===
Quarterfinals
1	South Florida	2^{12}
8	UConn	1
4	UCF	0
5	Memphis	3
3	Wichita State	1
6	Tulsa	3
2	Houston	3
7	East Carolina	1

Semifinals
1	South Florida	8
5	Memphis	7
6	Tulsa	7
2	Houston	3

Finals
1	South Florida	1
6	Tulsa	4

=== Game results ===
Date	Game	Winner	Score	Loser
May 10	Game 1	(6) Tulsa	3–1	(3) Wichita State
May 10	Game 2	(2) Houston	3–1	(7) East Carolina
May 10	Game 3	(5) Memphis	3–0	(4) UCF
May 10	Game 4	(1) South Florida	2–1 ^{(12)}	(8) UConn
May 11	Game 5	(6) Tulsa	7–3	(2) Houston
May 11	Game 6	(1) South Florida	8–7	(5) Memphis
May 12	Game 7	(6) Tulsa	4–1	(1) South Florida

== All-Tournament Team ==
The following players were named to the All-Tournament Team.

Name	Pos.	School
Jill Stockley	P	UConn
Arielle James	2B	Houston
Tierrah Williams	DP	Houston
Kyler Trosclair Klatt	SS	Memphis
Brooke Lee	2B	Memphis
Macy Cook	C	South Florida
Lindsey Devitt	2B	South Florida
Lauren Evans	1B	South Florida
Julia Hollingsworth	OF	Tulsa
Haley Meinen	LF	Tulsa
Morgan Neal	2B	Tulsa
Emily Watson	P	Tulsa

=== Most Outstanding Player ===
Emily Watson was named Tournament Most Outstanding Player for the second consecutive year. Watson was a pitcher for Tulsa who earned the win in all three of the Golden Hurricane's wins en route to the title.
