= 2021 American Athletic Conference softball tournament =

American college softball tournament

- Teams: 7
- Format: Single-elimination tournament
- Finals site: Collins Family Softball Complex; Tulsa, Oklahoma

2021 American Athletic Conference softball standings
	Conf.						Overall
Team	W		L		T	PCT	W		L		T	PCT
No. 23 Wichita State ‍†‍‡‍^{y}	18	–	5	–	1	.771	41	–	13	–	1	.755
South Florida ‍‍‍^{y}	16	–	7	–	0	.696	31	–	19	–	0	.620
UCF ‍‍‍^{y}	16	–	7	–	1	.688	41	–	19	–	1	.680
Tulsa ‍‍‍	15	–	8	–	0	.652	25	–	16	–	0	.610
Houston ‍‍‍	8	–	16	–	0	.333	17	–	33	–	0	.340
East Carolina ‍‍‍	7	–	17	–	0	.292	16	–	33	–	0	.327
Memphis ‍‍‍	2	–	22	–	0	.083	9	–	41	–	0	.180
† – Conference champion ‡ – Tournament champion y – Invited to the NCAA tournament As of May 23, 2021; Rankings from NFCA/USA Today

The 2021 American Athletic Conference softball tournament was held at the Collins Family Softball Complex on the campus of the University of Tulsa in Tulsa, Oklahoma from May 13 through May 15, 2021. The tournament winner earned the American Athletic Conference's automatic bid to the 2021 NCAA Division I softball tournament.

The 2019 Tournament was canceled due to weather, while the 2020 Tournament was canceled because of the COVID-19 pandemic, meaning that no champion had been crowned since 2018. Entering the 2021 event, Tulsa had won three titles, while UCF had won once.

== Tournament ==
=== Bracket ===
Quarterfinals
4	Tulsa	8
5	Houston	2
3	UCF	4
6	East Carolina	3
2	USF	10
7	Memphis	2

Semifinals
1	Wichita State	9
4	Tulsa	4
3	UCF	3
2	USF	2

Finals
1	Wichita State	7
3	UCF	4

=== Game schedule ===
Date	Game	Winner	Score	Loser
May 13	Game 1	(4) Tulsa vs (5) Houston		
May 13	Game 2	(3) UCF vs (6) East Carolina		
May 13	Game 3	(2) USF vs (7) Memphis		
May 14	Game 4	(1) Wichita State vs (4) Tulsa		
May 14	Game 5	(3) UCF vs (2) USF		
May 15	Game 6	(1) Wichita State vs (3) UCF		
