= 2015 American Athletic Conference softball tournament =

American college softball tournament

- Teams: 7
- Format: Single-elimination tournament
- Finals site: UCF Softball Complex; Orlando, Florida
- Champions: UCF (1st title)
- Winning coach: Renee Luers-Gillispie (1st title)
- MVP: Samantha McCloskey (UCF)

2015 American Athletic Conference softball standings
	Conf.				Overall
Team	W		L	PCT	W		L	PCT
No. 16 UCF ‍†‍‡‍^{y}	16	–	2	.889	50	–	9	.847
Tulsa ‍‍‍	12	–	6	.667	36	–	18	.667
Houston ‍‍‍	10	–	7	.588	28	–	27	.509
East Carolina ‍‍‍	7	–	11	.389	16	–	37	.302
South Florida ‍‍‍	6	–	10	.375	36	–	20	.643
Memphis ‍‍‍	6	–	12	.333	19	–	34	.358
UConn ‍‍‍	4	–	13	.235	18	–	35	.340
† – Conference champion ‡ – Tournament champion y – Invited to the NCAA tournament As of May 17, 2015; Rankings from USA Today/NFCA Coaches

The 2015 American Athletic Conference softball tournament was held at the UCF Softball Complex on the campus of the University of Central Florida in Orlando, Florida, from May 7 through May 9, 2015. The event determined the champion of the American Athletic Conference for the 2015 NCAA Division I softball season. Top-seeded UCF won the tournament and earned the American Athletic Conference's automatic bid to the 2015 NCAA Division I softball tournament. All games were televised; the quarterfinals and semifinals were shown on the American Digital Network while the championship was broadcast on ESPN2.

Former member Louisville won the only previous event, in 2014, and then departed for the Atlantic Coast Conference.

== Format and seeding ==
The American's 7 teams were seeded based on their conference winning percentage from the round-robin regular season. They then played a single elimination tournament, with the top seed receiving a single bye.

Team	W	L	Pct.	GB	Seed
UCF	16	2	.889	—	1
Tulsa	12	6	.667	4	2
Houston	10	7	.588	5.5	3
East Carolina	7	11	.389	9	4
South Florida	6	10	.375	9.5	5
Memphis	6	12	.333	10	6
UConn	4	13	.235	11.5	7

== Results ==
=== Bracket ===
Quarterfinals
4	East Carolina	0
5	South Florida	5
2	Tulsa	1
7	UConn	0
3	Houston	1
6	Memphis	0

Semifinals
1	UCF	3
5	South Florida	1
2	Tulsa	5
3	Houston	2

Finals
1	UCF	1
2	Tulsa	0

=== Game results ===
Date	Game	Winner	Score	Loser
May 7	Game 1	(3) Houston	1–0	(6) Memphis
May 7	Game 2	(2) Tulsa	1–0	(7) UConn
May 7	Game 3	(5) South Florida	5–0	(4) East Carolina
May 8	Game 4	(2) Tulsa	5–2	(3) Houston
May 8	Game 5	(1) UCF	3–1	(5) South Florida
May 9	Game 6	(1) UCF	1–0	(2) Tulsa

== All-Tournament Team ==
The following players were named to the All-Tournament Team.

Name	Pos.	School
D’Anna Devine	OF	USF
Shelby Miller	P	Houston
Julana Shrum	DP/P	Houston
Jodi Edmiston	RF	Tulsa
Caitlin Sill	P	Tulsa
Jocelyn Sheffield	DP	Tulsa
Maddie Withee	CF	Tulsa
Mackenzie Audas	P	UCF
Kahley Novak	2B	UCF
Shelby Turnier	P	UCF
Jessica Ujvari	DP	UCF
Samantha McCloskey	C	UCF

=== Most Outstanding Player ===
Samantha McCloskey was named Tournament Most Outstanding Player. McCloskey was a catcher for UCF.
