= 2019 American Athletic Conference softball tournament =

American college softball tournament

- Teams: 8
- Format: Single-elimination tournament
- Finals site: Cougar Softball Stadium; Houston, Texas
- Television: American Digital Network

2019 American Athletic Conference softball standings
	Conf.				Overall
Team	W		L	PCT	W		L	PCT
South Florida ‍†‍‍^{y}	17	–	4	.810	41	–	19	.683
Tulsa ‍‍‍^{y}	16	–	5	.762	37	–	20	.649
Houston ‍‍‍^{y}	12	–	7	.632	39	–	19	.672
Wichita State ‍‍‍	12	–	9	.571	32	–	24	.571
UCF ‍‍‍	11	–	10	.524	34	–	21	.618
UConn ‍‍‍	8	–	13	.381	21	–	29	.420
East Carolina ‍‍‍	4	–	17	.190	23	–	31	.426
Memphis ‍‍‍	3	–	17	.150	22	–	33	.400
† – Conference champion ‡ – Tournament champion y – Invited to the NCAA tournament As of June 5, 2019; Rankings from NFCA

The 2019 American Athletic Conference softball tournament was held at Cougar Softball Stadium on the campus of University of Houston in Houston, Texas, from May 9 through May 12, 2019. The tournament was to determine the champion of the American Athletic Conference for the 2019 NCAA Division I softball season. The tournament winner would have earned the American Athletic Conference's automatic bid to the 2019 NCAA Division I softball tournament. All games of the tournament aired on American Digital Network. Due to Weather conditions the last quarterfinal game between Houston and UConn, along with the two semifinal games, and championship game were canceled. Therefore the Automatic bid was awarded to the regular season champion South Florida.

Entering the event, Tulsa had won three straight championships, while UCF had won in 2015. Former member Louisville won the first Tournament in 2014.

== Format and seeding ==
The American's eight teams were seeded based on conference winning percentage from the round-robin regular season. They then played a single-elimination tournament.

Team	W	L	Pct.	GB	Seed
South Florida	17	4	.810	—	1
Tulsa	16	5	.762	1	2
Houston	12	7	.632	4	3
Wichita State	12	9	.571	5	4
UCF	11	10	.524	6	5
UConn	8	13	.381	9	6
East Carolina	4	17	.190	13	7
Memphis	3	17	.150	13.5	8

== Results ==
=== Tournament ===
Quarterfinals; May 9 American Digital Network
1	South Florida	8
8	Memphis	0
4	Wichita State	2
5	UCF	1
2	Tulsa	3
7	East Carolina	4^{(8)}
3	Houston
6	UConn

Semifinals; May 11; American Digital Network
1	South Florida
4	Wichita State
7	East Carolina

Championship; May 12; American Digital Network

=== Game restuls ===
Game	Time*	Matchup^{#}	Television	TV Announcers	Attendance
Quarterfinals – Thursday, May 9
1	10:05 a.m.	#1 South Florida vs. #12 Memphis	American Digital Network	Gerald Sanchez and Sydney Gerbracht	
2	12:35 p.m.	#4 Wichita State vs. #5 UCF	American Digital Network	Gerald Sanchez and Sydney Gerbracht	
3	3:05 p.m.	#2 Tulsa vs. #7 East Carolina	American Digital Network	Gerald Sanchez and Sydney Gerbracht	
4	6:12 p.m.	#3 Houston vs. #6 UConn	American Digital Network	Gerald Sanchez and Sydney Gerbracht	
Semifinals – Saturday, May 11
5	3:30 p.m.	#1 South Florida vs. #4 Wichita State	American Digital Network	Gerald Sanchez and Sydney Gerbracht	
6	6:00 p.m.	East Carolina vs. Winner of Game 4	American Digital Network	Gerald Sanchez and Sydney Gerbracht	
Championship – Sunday, May 12
7	11:00 a.m.	Winner of Game 5 vs. Winner of Game 6	American Digital Network	Gerald Sanchez and Sydney Gerbracht	
*Game times in EDT. # – Rankings denote tournament seed.

- The championship was originally scheduled for ESPN2 on Saturday. Rain delays on Friday moved the Championship to Sunday and made it an American Digital Network broadcast.
