= DJ Gasso =

American softball coach (born 1995)

Current position
- Title: Head coach
- Team: Tulsa
- Conference: American Conference
- Record: 0–0–0 (–)

Biographical details
- Born: January 6, 1995 (age 31); Norman, Oklahoma, U.S.
- Education: University of Oklahoma

Playing career
- 2015: Hutchinson Community College
- 2016–2017: Bradley
- 2018: Central Oklahoma

Coaching career (HC unless noted)
- 2021–2023: Utah (asst.)
- 2024–2026: Arkansas (asst.)
- 2027–present: Tulsa

Head coaching record
- Overall: 0–0–0 (–)

DJ Gasso (born January 6, 1995) is an American softball coach who is the current head coach at Tulsa.

== Playing career ==
Gasso began his college baseball career at Hutchinson Community College in Hutchinson, Kansas. He then spent two years at Bradley University, where he posted a .255 batting average, a .311 slugging percentage and a .363 on-base percentage. He transferred to the University of Central Oklahoma in 2018. During his senior year he recorded a .303 batting average, a .395 on-base percentage and a .364 slugging average.

He finished his master's degree in intercollegiate athletics administration at the University of Oklahoma while serving as a graduate assistant for the Oklahoma Sooners softball team.

== Coaching career ==
=== Utah ===
On June 23, 2020, Gasso was named an assistant coach for Utah. In his first season with Utah in 2021, the Utes hit 46 home runs, the most by a Utah team since 2012, and scored 237 runs, their most since 2017. In 2023, the Utes set single-season program records in runs (351), RBIs (316), slugging percentage (.483), doubles (84) and steals (99). Utah tied for fifth nationally in batting average (.327). He helped lead Utah to their first Women's College World Series appearance since 1994.

=== Arkansas ===
On June 29, 2023, Gasso was named an assistant coach for Arkansas, where he primarily served as the hitting coach. In his first season with Arkansas in 2024, the Razorbacks posted a 37–18 record. Under Gasso's tutelage, first baseman Bri Ellis earned NFCA All-America honors after posting a career-best .322 batting average and .444 on-base percentage with 14 home runs, 47 RBI, 36 runs scored and 97 total bases. In 2025, Arkansas set single-season records in runs scored (436), RBI (399), walks (291), doubles (90), on-base percentage (.439), and sacrifice flies (29).

=== Tulsa ===
On June 4, 2026, Gasso was named the head coach for Tulsa.

== Personal life ==
Gasso's mother, Patty, is the head softball coach for Oklahoma, while his father, Jim, is the head softball coach for Mid-America Christian University. His older brother, JT, is an associate head coach for Oklahoma.
