= Cindy Ball-Malone =

American softball coach

Current position
- Title: Head coach
- Team: UCF
- Conference: Big 12
- Record: 292–147–4 (.664)

Biographical details
- Born: December 14, 1979 (age 46); Simi Valley, California, U.S.
- Education: Pacific

Playing career
- 1999−2002: Pacific
- Position: Pitcher

Coaching career (HC unless noted)

College Softball
- 2002−2006: Pacific (asst.)
- 2007: Modesto Junior College
- 2008−2010: Cosumnes River College
- 2011−2012: Washington (asst.)
- 2013−2014: Cal State Northridge (asst.)
- 2015−2018: Boise State
- 2019–Present: UCF

Professional softball
- 2026-present: Utah Talons

National team
- 2019-2022: Team USA women's softball (asst.)

Head coaching record
- Overall: 391–263–4 (.597)

Accomplishments and honors

Championships
- MWC Regular Season Championship (2018); AAC Regular Season Champions (2022); 2× AAC Tournament Champions (2022, 2023)

Awards
- As player: 2× Big West Pitcher of the Year (2001, 2002); 2× Louisville Slugger/NFCA Division I Third Team All-American (2001, 2002); Verizon Academic All-America First Team (2002); All-Big West Second Team (1999); 3× All-Big West First Team (2000, 2001, 2002); 2× NFCA All-West Region First Team (2001, 2002); NFCA All-West Region Second Team (2000); As coach: MWC Coach of the Year (2018); AAC Coach of the Year (2022); AAC Coaching Staff of the Year (2022); Extra Innings Softball National Coach of the Year (2022); NFCA Mideast Region Coaching Staff of the Year (2022); NFCA Gulf Region Coaching Staff of the Year (2026)

Cynthia Lynn Ball-Malone (née Ball; born December 14, 1979) is an American softball coach and former player who is the head coach at UCF and for the Utah Talons of the Athletes Unlimited Softball League (AUSL). She played college softball at the University of the Pacific.

== Early life and education ==
Ball-Malone graduated from the University of the Pacific in 2002 with a bachelor's degree in sports sciences and earned her master's in education in 2006. She played softball, volleyball, and basketball in middle school and high school with famed Stanford and USA softball player, Jessica Mendoza.

== Playing career ==
Ball-Malone was named to the NFCA All-American team in 2001 and 2002. She was inducted into the Pacific Hall of Fame in 2014 and had her jersey No. 9 retired by the school.

On February 10, 2023, Ball-Malone was the Pacific Tigers honoree in the 2023 West Coast Conference Hall of Honor. She is labeled as the best two-way player in program history.

== Coaching career ==
=== Boise State ===
On August 29, 2014, Ball-Malone was announced as the new head coach of the Boise State softball program.

=== UCF ===
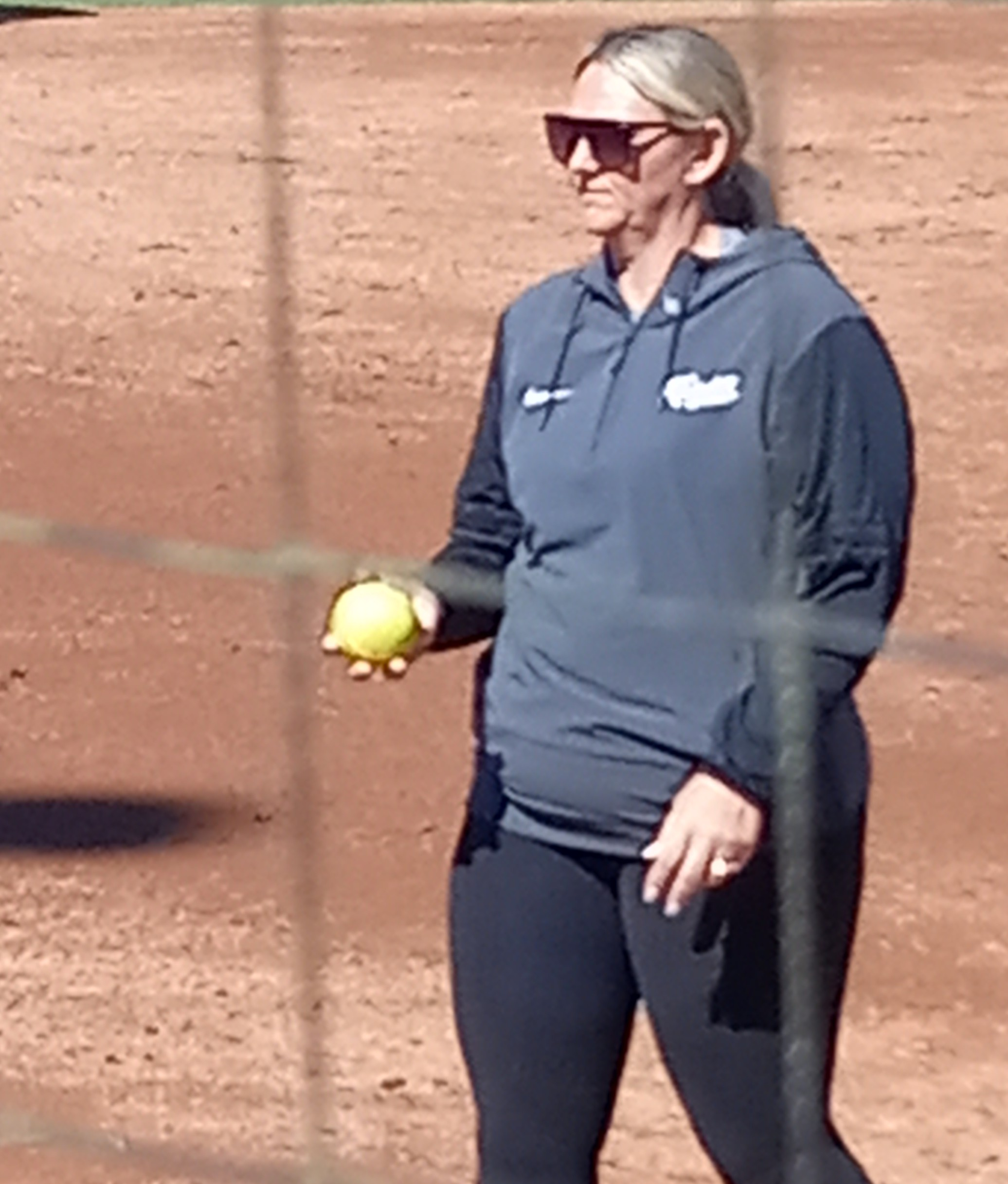
UCF Softball Coach Cindy Ball-Malone during a home game with Buffalo, 2-8-26.

On June 27, 2018, Ball-Malone was announced as the new head coach of the UCF softball program. The 2022 season, under Ball-Malone, UCF won a conference regular season and tournament title. Central Florida would also advance to their first ever NCAA Super Regional after downing Michigan in the Orlando Regional Final. Following the successful 2022 season, Ball-Malone's contract was extended through 2027 on July 22 of 2022. She has also been tasked with continuing the program's success in a new conference in 2024, after UCF agreed to a move to join the Big 12 Conference.

=== Team USA ===
On March 4, 2019, Ball-Malone was selected to serve as an assistant coach for the USA Junior National Team.

=== Utah Talons ===
On March 30, 2026, Ball-Malone was announced as head coach of the Utah Talons of the Athletes Unlimited Softball League (AUSL).

== Personal life ==
She is married to Robert Malone III and the couple has four children.

== Head coaching record ==
=== College ===
Record table
Season	Team	Overall	Conference	Standing	Postseason
Boise State Broncos (Mountain West Conference) (2015–2018)
2015	Boise State	12–42	4–20	9th	
2016	Boise State	14–38	6–18	9th	
2017	Boise State	33–20	12–12	6th	
2018	Boise State	40–16	18–6	1st	
Boise State:		99–116 (.460)	40–56 (.417)		
UCF Knights (American Athletic Conference) (2019–2023)
2019	UCF	34–21	11–10	5th	
2020	UCF	21–5–1	0–0		Season canceled due to COVID-19
2021	UCF	41–19–1	16–7–1	3rd	NCAA Regional
2022	UCF	49–14	16–2	1st	NCAA Super Regional
2023	UCF	40–21	15–3	2nd	NCAA Regional
UCF Knights (Big 12 Conference) (2024–Present)
2024	UCF	31–25	12–15	5th	NCAA Regional
2025	UCF	35-24-1	12-12	7th	NCAA Regional
2026	UCF	41-18-1	14-9-1	4th	NCAA Super Regional
UCF:		292–147–4 (.664)	96–58–2 (.622)		
Total:		391–263–4 (.597)			
National champion Postseason invitational champion Conference regular season champion Conference regular season and conference tournament champion Division regular season champion Division regular season and conference tournament champion Conference tournament champion

== Coaching tree ==
Coached under:

- Brian Kolze: Pacific (2002–2006)
- Heather Tarr: Washington (2011–2012)
- Tairia Flowers: Cal State Northridge (2013−2014)
