= Crissy Strimple =

American softball coach

Biographical details
- Born: c. 1980 (age 45–46); Moore, Oklahoma, U.S.
- Education: Tulsa

Playing career
- 2000–2001: Northeastern Oklahoma A&M
- 2002–2003: Tulsa

Coaching career (HC unless noted)
- 2005–2006: Arkansas (Dir. of Operations)
- 2007: Central Arkansas (asst)
- 2008–2011: Tulsa (asst.)
- 2012–2019: Tulsa (assoc. HC)
- 2020–2026: Tulsa

Head coaching record
- Overall: 149–167–1 (.472)

Crissy Strimple is an American softball coach who most recently served as the head coach at Tulsa.

== Coaching career ==
=== Tulsa ===
On June 12, 2019, Strimple was promoted to head coach for Tulsa. On May 8, 2026, Tula announced they would not renew her contract.

== Head coaching record ==
=== College ===
Record table
| Season | Team | Overall | Conference | Standing | Postseason |
|---|---|---|---|---|---|
Tulsa Golden Hurricane (American Athletic Conference) (2020–Present)
| 2020 | Tulsa | 13–11 | 0–0 | | |
| 2021 | Tulsa | 25–16 | 15–8 | 4th | |
| 2022 | Tulsa | 18–30–1 | 7–9–1 | 5th | |
| 2023 | Tulsa | 25–28 | 9–9 | 4th | |
| Tulsa: | | 81–85–1 (.488) | 31–26–1 (.543) | | |
| Total: | | 81–85–1 (.488) | | | |
National champion Postseason invitational champion Conference regular season champion Conference regular season and conference tournament champion Division regular season champion Division regular season and conference tournament champion Conference tournament champion
