= 2017 American Athletic Conference softball tournament =

American college softball tournament

- Teams: 7
- Format: Single-elimination tournament
- Finals site: East Carolina Softball Complex; Greenville, North Carolina
- Champions: Tulsa (2nd title)
- Winning coach: John Bargfeldt (2nd title)
- MVP: Emily Watson (Tulsa)
- Television: ESPN; American Digital Network

2017 American Athletic Conference softball standings
	Conf.				Overall
Team	W		L	PCT	W		L	PCT
No. 22 Tulsa ‍†‍‡‍^{y}	15	–	3	.833	37	–	15	.712
Houston ‍‍‍	12	–	6	.667	28	–	24	.538
UCF ‍‍‍	11	–	7	.611	29	–	22	.569
South Florida ‍‍‍	9	–	8	.529	32	–	23	.582
Memphis ‍‍‍	7	–	11	.389	28	–	26	.519
East Carolina ‍‍‍	5	–	13	.278	25	–	29	.463
UConn ‍‍‍	3	–	14	.176	17	–	30	.362
† – Conference champion ‡ – Tournament champion y – Invited to the NCAA tournament As of May 23, 2017; Rankings from Today/NFCA Coaches

The 2017 American Athletic Conference softball tournament was held at the East Carolina Softball Complex on the campus of the East Carolina University in Greenville, North Carolina, from May 10 through May 13, 2017. The event determined the champion for the American Athletic Conference for the 2017 NCAA Division I softball season. Top-seeded Tulsa won the Tournament for the second year in a row and earned the American Athletic Conference's automatic bid to the 2017 NCAA Division I softball tournament.

Entering the Tournament, Tulsa was defending champion, while UCF had won in 2015. Former member Louisville won the first Tournament in 2014.

== Format and seeding ==
The American's seven teams were seeded based on conference winning percentage from the round-robin regular season. They then played a single-elimination tournament with the top seed receiving a single bye.

Team	W	L	Pct.	GB	Seed
Tulsa	15	3	.833	—	1
Houston	12	6	.667	3	2
UCF	11	7	.611	4	3
South Florida	9	8	.529	5.5	4
Memphis	7	11	.389	8	5
East Carolina	5	13	.278	10	6
UConn	3	14	.176	11.5	7

== Results ==
=== Tournament ===
Quarterfinals
4	South Florida	0
5	Memphis	7
3	UCF	2
6	East Carolina	4
2	Houston	7
7	UConn	0

Semifinals
1	Tulsa	6
5	Memphis	0
6	East Carolina	0
2	Houston	6

Finals
1	Tulsa	1
2	Houston	0

=== Game results ===
Date	Game	Winner	Score	Loser
May 11	Game 1	(6) East Carolina	4–2	(3) UCF
May 11	Game 2	(2) Houston	7–0	(7) UConn
May 12	Game 3	(5) Memphis	7–0	(4) South Florida
May 12	Game 4	(2) Houston	6–0	(6) East Carolina
May 12	Game 5	(1) Tulsa	6–0	(5) Memphis
May 13	Game 6	(1) Tulsa	1–0	(2) Houston

== All-Tournament Team ==
The following players were named to the All-Tournament Team.

Name	School
Kacie Oshiro	East Carolina
Meredith Burroughs	East Carolina
Lindsey Stickrod	Memphis
Molly Smith	Memphis
Savannah Heebner	Houston
Sarah Barker	Houston
Maya Thomas	Houston
Kaylin Crumpton	Houston
Maggie Withee	Tulsa
Tori Stafford	Tulsa
Morgan Neal	Tulsa
Emily Watson	Tulsa

=== Most Outstanding Player ===
Emily Watson was named Tournament Most Outstanding Player. Watson was a pitcher for Tulsa.
