= 2026 American Conference softball tournament =

American college softball tournament

- Teams: 10
- Format: Single-elimination tournament
- Finals site: Max R. Joyner Family Stadium; Greenville, North Carolina
- Champions: South Florida (2nd title)
- Winning coach: Ken Eriksen (2nd title)
- MVP: Anne Long (South Florida)

2026 American Conference softball standings
	Conf.				Overall
Team	W		L	PCT	W		L	PCT
South Florida ‍†‍‡‍^{y}	21	–	6	.778	44	–	17	.721
Wichita State ‍†‍‍	21	–	6	.778	35	–	17	.673
East Carolina ‍‍‍	16	–	11	.593	34	–	25	.576
Florida Atlantic ‍‍‍	14	–	13	.519	34	–	20	.630
Charlotte ‍‍‍	14	–	13	.519	31	–	26	.544
North Texas ‍‍‍	14	–	13	.519	28	–	28	.500
UTSA ‍‍‍	11	–	16	.407	24	–	33	.421
Tulsa ‍‍‍	10	–	17	.370	20	–	32	.385
UAB ‍‍‍	8	–	19	.296	21	–	33	.389
Memphis ‍‍‍	6	–	21	.222	18	–	39	.316
† – Conference champion ‡ – Tournament champion y – Invited to the NCAA tournament As of May 17, 2026; Rankings from NFCA/USA Today

The 2026 American Athletic Conference Softball tournament was held at the Max R. Joyner Family Stadium on the campus of East Carolina University in Greenville, North Carolina from May 6 through May 9, 2026. The tournament was won by the South Florida Bulls, who earned the American Athletic Conference's automatic bid to the 2026 NCAA Division I softball tournament.

Entering the 2026 event, Tulsa had won three titles, most among active members.

== Format and seeding ==
All ten teams participated, with the lowest four seeds facing off in the opening round. The winners advanced to play the fifth and sixth seeds, and winners of those games advanced to play third and fourth seeds. The top two seeds had a bye to the semifinals of the single-elimination tournament.

== Tournament ==
=== Bracket ===
Round 1
8	Tulsa	2
9	UAB	1
7	UTSA	8
10	Memphis	6

Round 2
5	Charlotte	2
8	Tulsa	0
6	North Texas	7
7	UTSA	6

Quarterfinals
4	Florida Atlantic	5
5	Charlotte	4
3	East Carolina	4^{(9)}
6	North Texas	2

Semifinals
1	South Florida	3
4	Florida Atlantic	0
2	Wichita State	2
3	East Carolina	3

Final
1	South Florida	5
3	East Carolina	1

== All Tournament Team ==
Player	Team
Sydney Lewis	Charlotte
Anneca Anderson	North Texas
Ryley Nihart	Wichita State
Julia Apostolakos	East Carolina
Sydney Rainford	East Carolina
Anna Sawyer	East Carolina
Hailey Deter	East Carolina
Olivia Elliott	South Florida
Jamia Nelson	South Florida
Kathy Garcia-Soto	South Florida
**Anne Long**	South Florida
Alex Wilkes	South Florida

MVP in bold
