= John Bargfeldt =

American softball coach

Biographical details
- Born: December 20, 1955 (age 70); Gary, Indiana, U.S.
- Education: Anderson University (IN)

Playing career
- 1975–1977: Anderson

Coaching career (HC unless noted)

Softball
- 2004: Georgia Tech (asst.)
- 2006–2019: Tulsa
- 2020–2023: Oklahoma State (asst.)

Baseball
- 1980–1982: Anderson

Head coaching record
- Overall: 535–270–1 (.664)
- Tournaments: NCAA: 14–22 (.389)

Accomplishments and honors

Championships
- AAC Regular Season Champions (2017) 3× AAC tournament Champions (2016, 2017, 2018); 5× C-USA Regular Season Champions (2006, 2009, 2011, 2012, 2014) 4× C-USA Tournament Champions (2006, 2009, 2012, 2014)

Awards
- AAC Coaching Staff of the Year (2017); 3× C-USA Coach of the Year (2011, 2012, 2014)

John Bargfeldt (born December 20, 1955) is an American softball coach, who is a former assistant coach and pitching coach at Oklahoma State. He is also the former head coach at Tulsa.

== Coaching career ==
On June 21, 2005, Bargfeldt was announced as the new head coach of the Tulsa softball program. On June 6, 2019, he announced his resignation as head softball coach at Tulsa to pursue better opportunities.

On June 14, 2019, Bargfeldt was announced as the new pitching coach of the Oklahoma State softball program. On June 14, 2023, Bargfeldt announced his retirement from coaching.

== Head coaching record ==
=== College ===
Record table
Season	Team	Overall	Conference	Standing	Postseason
Tulsa Golden Hurricane (Conference USA) (2006–2014)
2006	Tulsa	34–24	15–8	1st	NCAA Regional
2007	Tulsa	30–28	13–10	3rd	
2008	Tulsa	34–25	14–10	3rd	NCAA Regional
2009	Tulsa	40–17	16–4	1st	NCAA Regional
2010	Tulsa	31–21	14–6	2nd	
2011	Tulsa	46–15	19–5	T-1st	NCAA Regional
2012	Tulsa	42–14	19–5	1st	NCAA Regional
2013	Tulsa	42–16–1	19–5	T-2nd	NCAA Regional
2014	Tulsa	53–9	19–4	1st	NCAA Regional
Tulsa Golden Hurricane (American Athletic Conference) (2015–2019)
2015	Tulsa	36–18	12–6	2nd	
2016	Tulsa	35–21	9–9	3rd	NCAA Regional
2017	Tulsa	41–17	15–3	1st	NCAA Regional
2018	Tulsa	34–25	10–11	6th	NCAA Regional
2019	Tulsa	37–20	16–5	2nd	NCAA Regional
Tulsa:		535–270–1 (.664)	210–91 (.698)		
Total:		535–270–1 (.664)			
National champion Postseason invitational champion Conference regular season champion Conference regular season and conference tournament champion Division regular season champion Division regular season and conference tournament champion Conference tournament champion
