= Tulsa Golden Hurricane softball =

- 2027 Tulsa Golden Hurricane softball
- Founded: 1993 (33 years ago)
- University: University of Tulsa
- Head coach: DJ Gasso (1st season)
- Conference: The American
- Location: Tulsa, Oklahoma, US
- Home stadium: Collins Family Softball Complex (capacity: 1000)
- Nickname: Golden Hurricane
- Colors: Old gold, royal blue, and crimson

NCAA Tournament appearances
- 2006, 2008, 2009, 2011, 2012, 2013, 2014, 2016, 2017, 2018, 2019

Conference tournament championships
- Conference USA; 2006, 2009, 2012, 2014; AAC; 2016, 2017, 2018

Regular-season conference championships
- Conference USA; 2006, 2009, 2011, 2012, 2014; AAC; 2017

The Tulsa Golden Hurricane Softball is the team that represents the University of Tulsa in NCAA Division I college softball. The team currently participates in the American Conference. The Golden Hurricane are currently led by their head coach DJ Gasso. The team plays its home games at the Collins Family Softball Complex which is located on the university's campus.

== History ==
=== Coaching history ===
Years	Coach	Record	%
1993–1997	Pattie Holthaus	69–192	.264
1998–2000	Lori Castellano	59–107	.355
2001–2004	Jamie Pinkerton	140–105	.571
2005	Christy Connoyer	31–30	.608
2006–2019	John Bargfeldt	535–270–1	.664
2020–2026	Crissy Strimple	56–57–1	.496
2027–Present	DJ Gasso	0–0	–

== Championships ==
=== Conference championships ===
Season	Conference	Record	Head coach
2006	Conference USA	15–8	John Bargfeldt
2009	Conference USA	16–4	John Bargfeldt
2011	Conference USA	19–5	John Bargfeldt
2012	Conference USA	19–5	John Bargfeldt
2014	Conference USA	19–4	John Bargfeldt
2017	American Athletic Conference	15–3	John Bargfeldt

=== Conference tournament championships ===
Year	Conference	Tournament location	Head coach
2006	Conference USA	Tulsa, OK	John Bargfeldt
2009	Conference USA	El Paso, TX	John Bargfeldt
2012	Conference USA	Birmingham, AL	John Bargfeldt
2014	Conference USA	Boca Raton, FL	John Bargfeldt
2016	American Athletic Conference	Tulsa, OK	John Bargfeldt
2017	American Athletic Conference	Greenville, NC	John Bargfeldt
2018	American Athletic Conference	Tampa, FL	John Bargfeldt

== Coaching staff ==
Name	Position coached	Consecutive season at Tulsa in current position
DJ Gasso	Head coach	1st
Amber Fiser	Assistant coach	1st

== Awards and honors ==
=== Conference awards ===
AAC Pitcher of the Year

- Emily Watson, 2017

AAC Player of the Year

- Julia Hollingsworth, 2019

AAC Defensive Player of the Year

- Rylie Spell, 2018

AAC Rookie of the Year

- Chenise Delce, 2019
