= UCF Knights softball =

- Founded: 2002 (24 years ago)
- University: University of Central Florida
- Head coach: Cindy Ball-Malone (8th season)
- Conference: Big 12
- Location: Orlando, Florida, US
- Home stadium: UCF Softball Complex (capacity: 600)
- Nickname: UCF Knights
- Colors: Black and gold

NCAA super regional appearances
- 2022, 2026

NCAA Tournament appearances
- 2005, 2008, 2010, 2012, 2014, 2015, 2016, 2021, 2022, 2023, 2024, 2025, 2026

Conference tournament championships
- 2005, 2008, 2015, 2022, 2023

Regular-season conference championships
- 2014, 2015, 2022

The UCF Knights softball program represents the University of Central Florida in the sport of softball. The Knights compete in Division I of the National Collegiate Athletic Association (NCAA) and the Big 12 Conference (one of the four NCAA Power Conferences). The Knights play their home games at the UCF Softball Complex (also known as "the Plex") on UCF's main campus in Orange County, Florida near Orlando. The Knights are coached by head coach Cindy Ball-Malone. During the quarter-century history of the program, the Knights have won three regular season conference championships, five conference tournament championships, and have earned twelve appearances in the NCAA Tournament (including Super-Regional Appearances in 2022 and 2026). In twenty-five seasons of play, the Knights have winning records in twenty-three of those seasons, and at least 30 wins in nineteen of those seasons (as of 2026); ranking the UCF program in the top-25 in all-time wins percentage amongst all NCAA softball programs.

Seven UCF Softball players have earned various All-American honors; while numerous UCF players have earned various national, regional and conference recognitions. After their careers at UCF, a number of Knights have played in pro-Softball leagues, including: Stephanie Best, Allison Kime, Breanne Javier, Shelby Turnier, Jada Cody, and Sarah Willis. Eight players have also made National Team squads, including Abby McClain, Jada Cody and Jasmine Williams (who played for the U.S. Women's National Softball Team).

== History ==
=== The Renee Luers-Gillispie era ===
==== The early years ====
The UCF softball program was founded in 2002, with Renee Luers-Gillispie as Head Coach. The Knights played their first games on February 2, losing the first contest 2–3 to Bethune–Cookman, and winning their second game against Arkansas, 6–5. The program played its first four seasons in the Atlantic Sun Conference (now known as the ASUN Conference). In their last year in the conference, the Knights won their first conference tournament championship, defeating Troy twice in one day, and made their first NCAA tournament appearance. In 2005, UCF moved to Conference USA, where they remained until joining the American Athletic Conference in 2014. UCF joined the Big 12 Conference after the 2023 season.

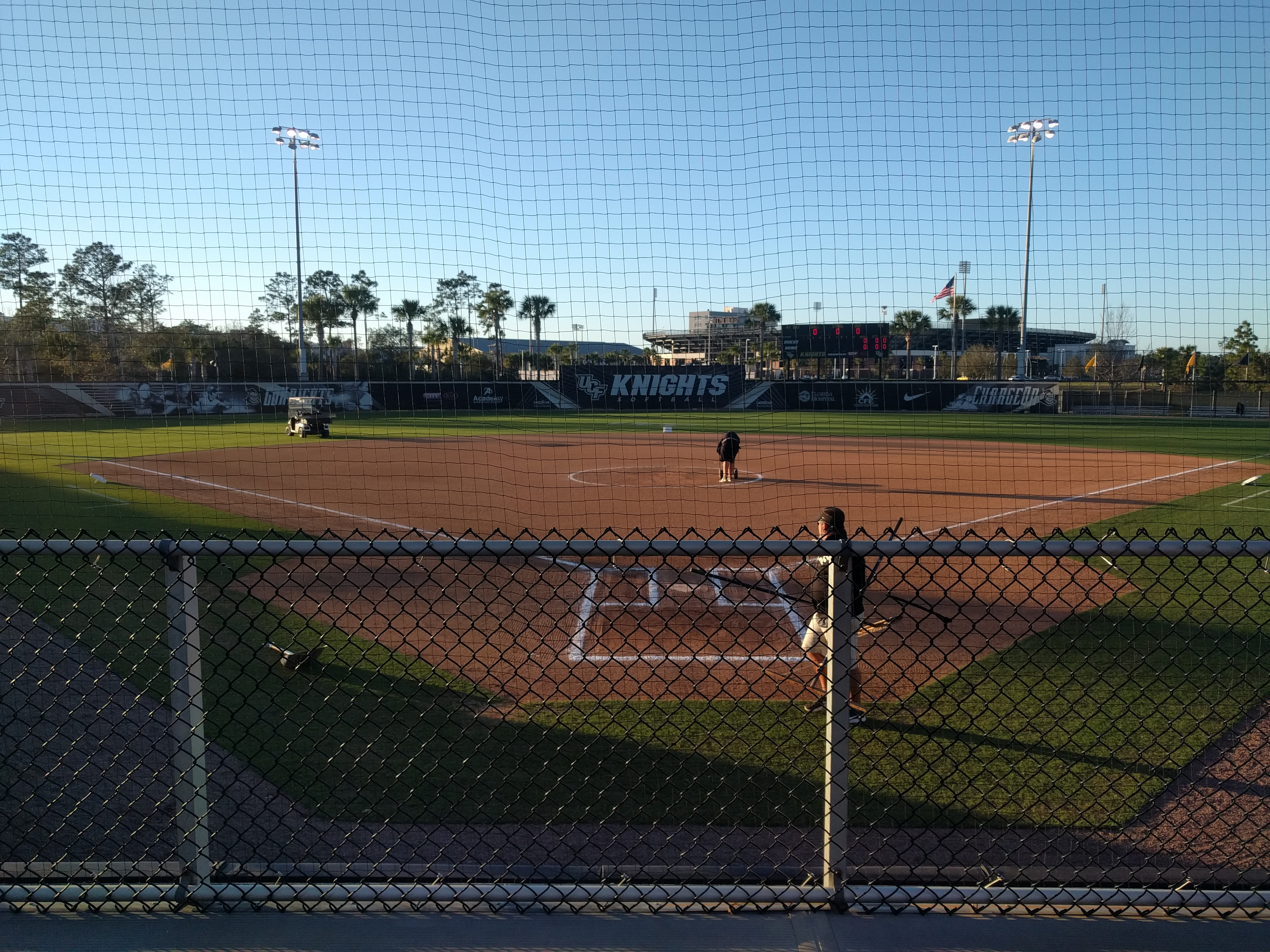
UCF Softball Complex

The UCF Softball Complex opened on March 14, 2006, with the Knights winning two games that day, a 10–9 victory over Marshall and a 7–3 win over Furman. In 2008, Gillespie would lead the Knights to their second conference tournament championship, their first in C-USA, and their second appearance in the NCAA tournament, by defeating #9 Houston. During the tournament, UCF defeated #1 Florida 1–0. In both 2010 and 2012, Gillespie led the Knights to the NCAA tournament.

During this period, the Knights earned nine no-hitters, including two perfect games. The first two no-hitters in program history were perfect games, and four no-hitters were pitched by Allison Kime. In 2007, Kime recorded the most strikeouts for a pitcher in program history, earning 18 strikeouts against Florida State to help her team win a 1-0 12-inning victory against the Seminoles.

One of the first players to join the UCF Softball program was Stephanie Best, who is still the most decorated Knight in the history of UCF Softball. She established the foundation for the program as a three-time Conference Player of the Year, holding school career records in batting average (.384), runs (216), RBI (213), hits (285), home runs (71), and slugging percentage (.756). Best's 71 career home runs record remains in the top-10 all time for NCAA softball players. During her UCF career, she scored 216 runs, 213 RBIs, and made 558 assists. In 2005, Best scored 26 home runs in one season, the most of any batter in NCAA softball for that year, which set a program record that has yet to be surpassed. During a March, 2003, matchup against Army, Best set two NCAA records; for the most RBIs in one game (11) and most grand slams in one inning (2). In that same game, she also scored three home runs in one game (the latter setting a record that would not be matched by a UCF batter for 23 years). .

==== UCF in the American Athletic Conference ====
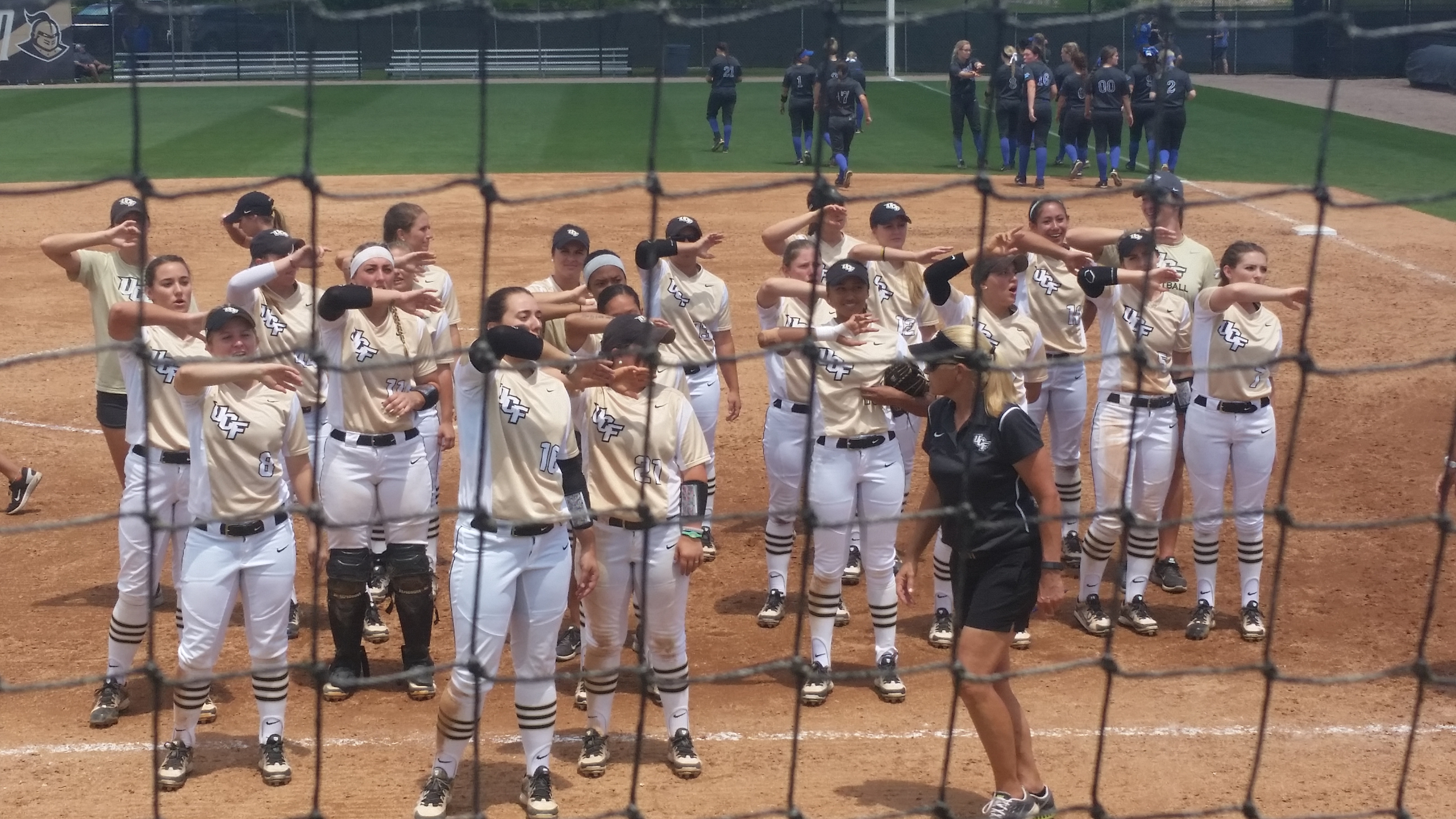
UCF Softball players engage in the post-game home victory ritual of "the Knights' Noble Chant" after win over the Memphis Tigers at the UCF Softball Complex in April, 2016. UCF Head Coach Renee Luers-Gillispie in the foreground.

After joining the American Athletic Conference in 2014, the Knights began a period of dominance in their new league. During their first years in the conference, UCF earned two conference regular season titles, two conference tournament championships, and three NCAA Tournament appearances. The Knights did not lose a regular season conference series during their first three years in the conference (2014 to 2016), winning 17 regular season conference series in a row from 2014 into the 2017 season.

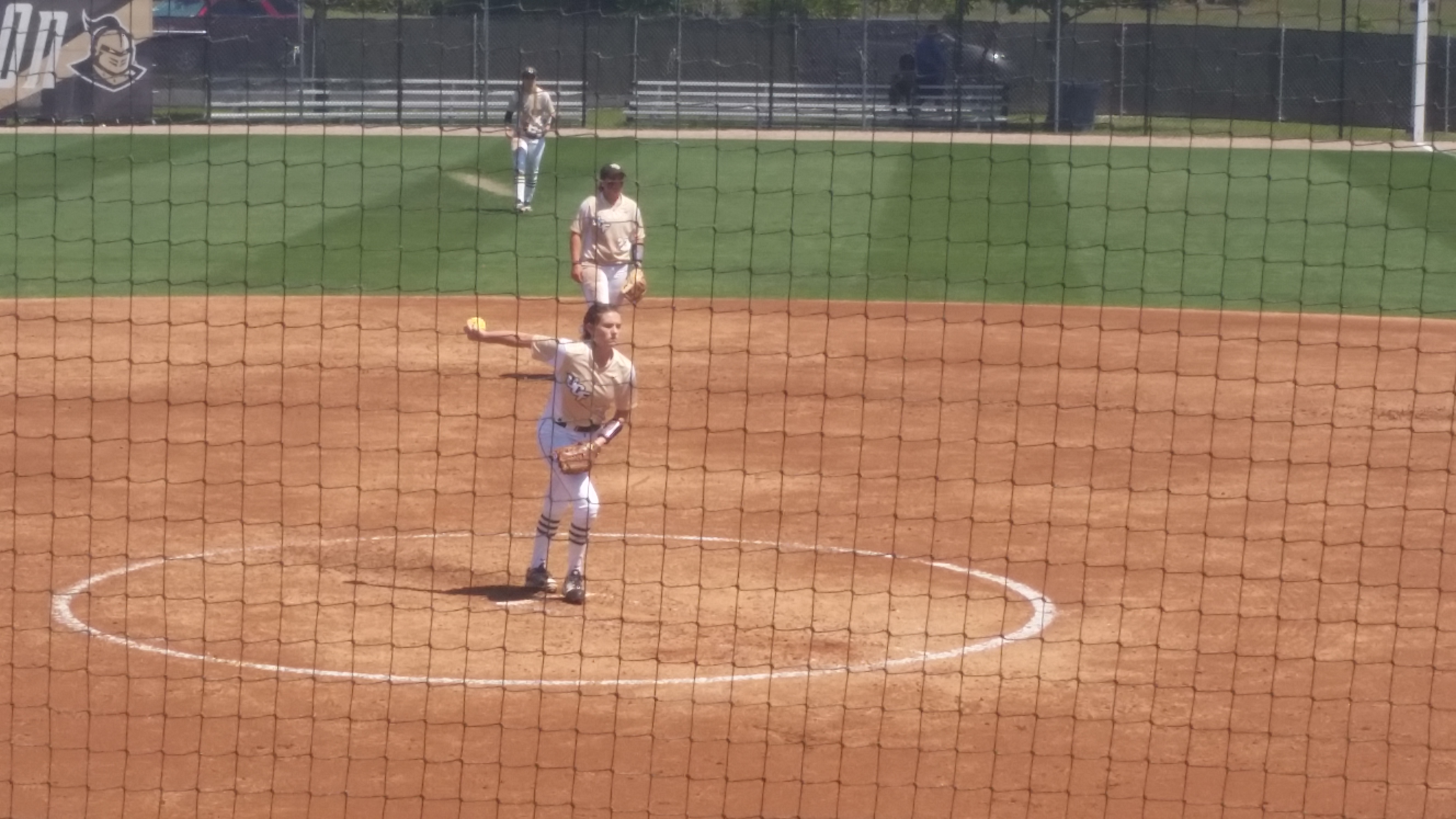
UCF Softball Pitcher Shelby Turnier on the mound for a home game against the Memphis Tigers in 2016.

The Knights' success during this period was due in large part to dominant pitching. Two UCF players who owned the mound from 2014 to 2015 were Mackenzie Audas and Shelby Turnier; the duo known around UCF Softball as "Shake-and-Bake." Audas still holds many UCF career pitching records, including career strikeouts (945) and No-Hitters (5). Audas' 78 wins rank third all-time in program history. In 2015, Turnier posted the lowest ERA in the nation (0.87); a UCF single-season record. Turnier became the third UCF pitcher in school history to reach 70 career wins and 800 strikeouts. She ranks second all-time in career wins. A few years later, Alea White took over the mound at UCF, and became the all-time leader for wins in program history (99) during her five seasons with the Knights (2017 to 2021). During the 2018 season, White was ranked in the top-25 in all of NCAA Softball for wins on the mound (tied for 22nd). She also holds UCF records for number of starts (139), number of appearances in games (180), innings pitched (969), and complete games (103). Also during that time, UCF Shortstop/Second Baseman Kahley Novak became the program's all-time leader in stolen bases (125).

=== The Cindy Ball-Malone era ===
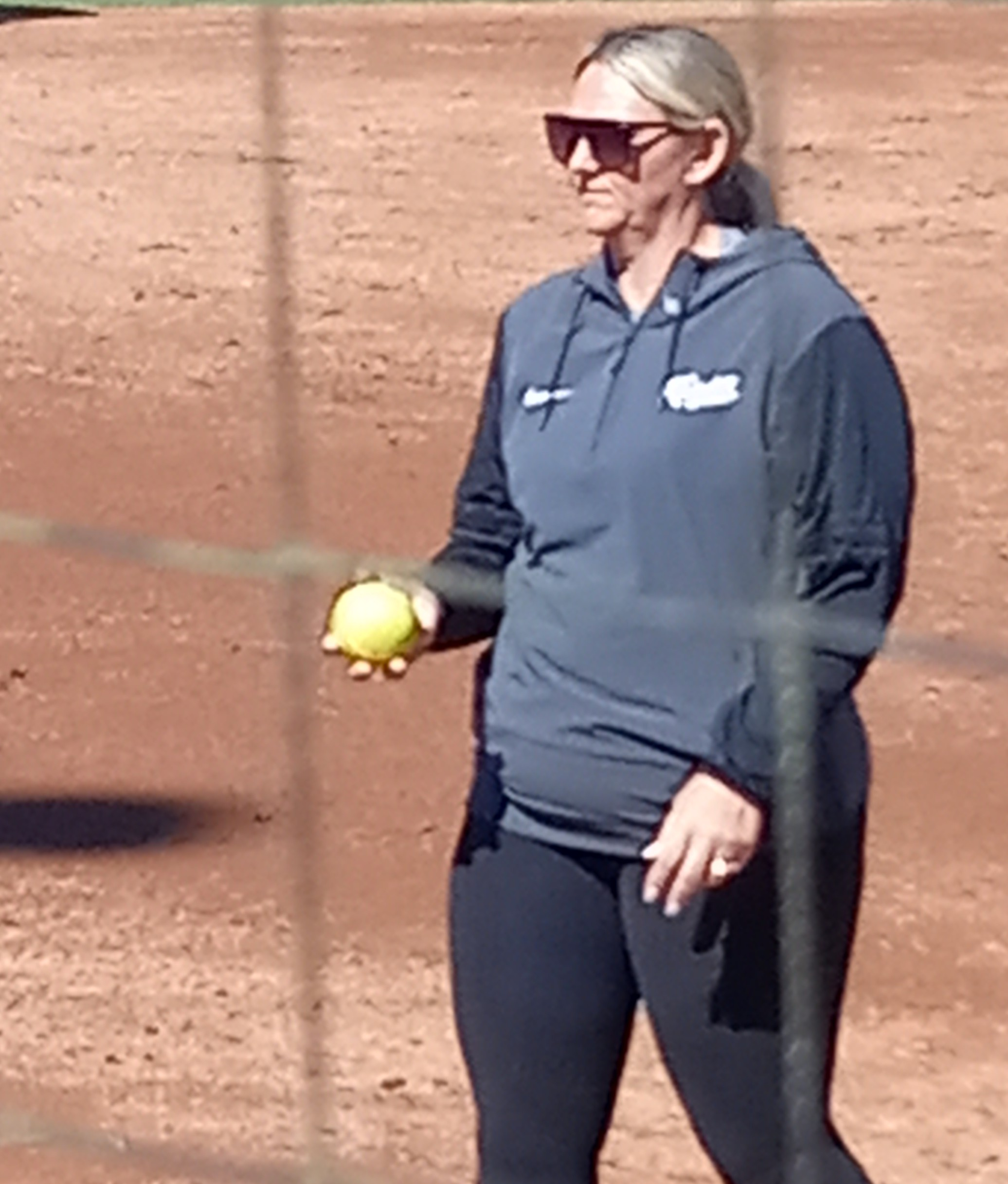
UCF Softball Coach Cindy Ball-Malone during a home game with Buffalo, 2-8-26.

In 2019, Coach Cindy Ball-Malone took over the UCF Softball program when Renee Luers-Gillispie left to become the Head Coach at the University of Iowa. Known as "Coach Bear", Ball-Malone (who had been a successful coach at Boise State) would lead UCF softball to new heights of success. She would later become an Assistant Coach with the United States Women's National Softball team and with the Athletes Unlimited Pro Softball League while still the Head Coach at UCF.

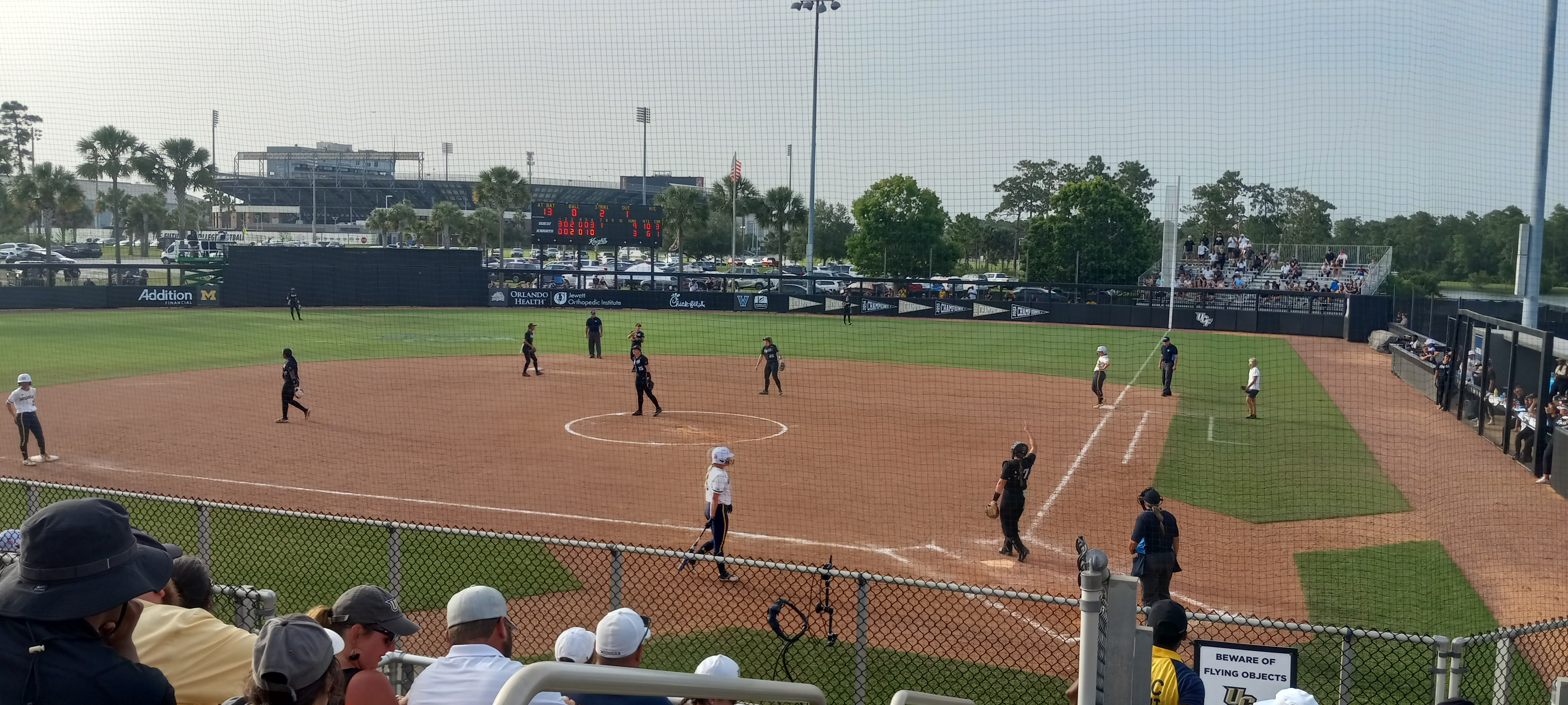
UCF Softball hosts Michigan in the 2022 NCAA Orlando Regional Final on May 22, 2022.

In 2022, UCF hosted a regional for the first time, winning the regional final by defeating Michigan 9 to 4. The Knights went on to lose in the Super Regionals to that year's Women's College World Series (WCWS) winners, Oklahoma. During this period, the Knights made six straight NCAA Regional Tournament appearances, and played in the final game of four of those six regional tournaments (winning two of those regional finals).

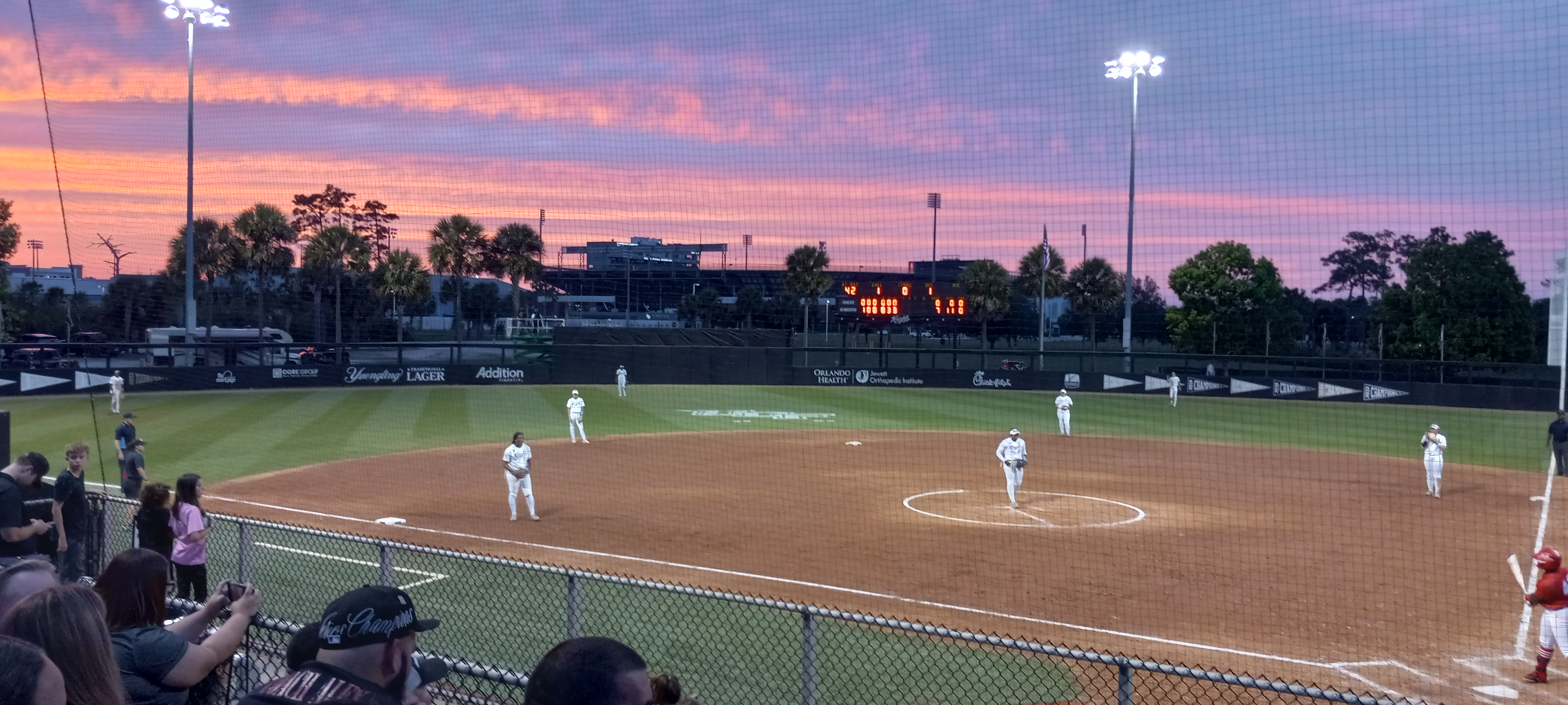
UCF Softball game between UCF and Houston, during which UCF Pitcher Sarah Willis (on the pitcher's mound in the photo) pitched a perfect game (April 28, 2023)

In 2022, UCF First Baseman Shannon Doherty became known as the "Walk-Off Queen" of UCF by delivering three wins for the Knights during that season by scoring walk-off runs; two against ranked teams (#12 Georgia; Ole Miss; #5 Virginia Tech). Another legendary player during that period was Jada Cody, who finished her career as the Knights' all-time leader in doubles (54/55), 3rd all-time in total hits (263), and 2nd in RBIs (175) and home runs (39). She recorded 70 hits during the 2023 season and led the nation in hits for a large stretch of that season. On April 28, 2023, UCF Pitcher Sarah Willis pitched a full 7 inning perfect game in a 7–0 win over the Houston Cougars. This was only the 3rd perfect game for a UCF pitcher in program history (the first 7 inning perfect game in UCF Softball history). Willis finished her UCF career ranked sixth in lowest batting average-against (. 198) and lowest ERA (1.98), seventh in saves (3), ninth in winning decisions (29), strikeouts (239), innings pitched (289.2), and shutouts (7), and 10th in complete games (21) at the time of her graduation. In a 2024 1–2 home loss to the Oklahoma Sooners, Willis held that year's Women's College World Series (WCWS) Champions to only two hits; their lowest hits total that year.

UCF ended their 10 years (2014 to 2023) in the American Athletic Conference as the league's most successful program up to that time, with an overall conference record of 126–48–1. The Knights won six Conference Championships during their ten years in the conference (2014 regular season; 2015 regular season and tournament; 2022 regular season and tournament; 2023 tournament).

==== The Knights join the Big 12 Conference ====
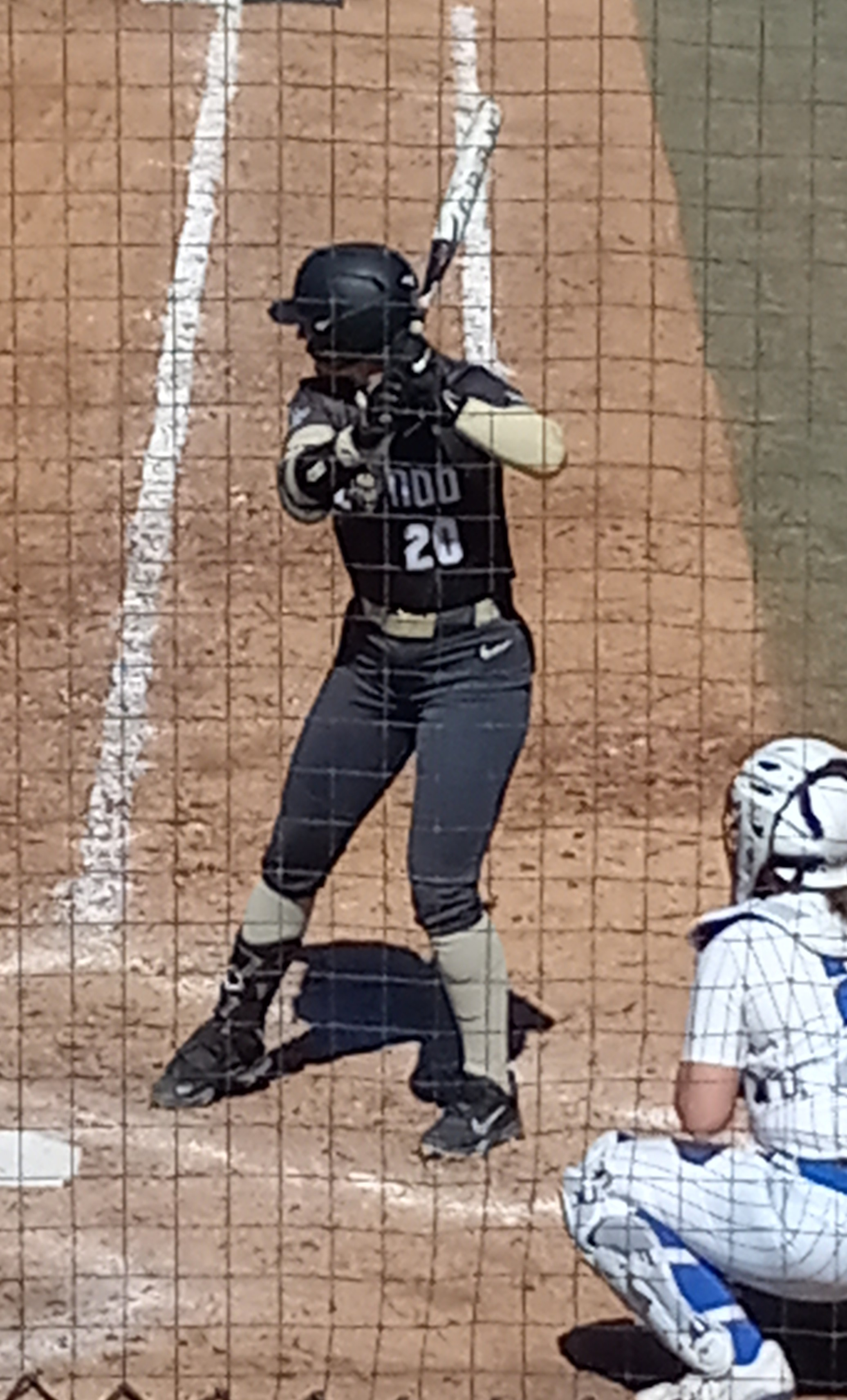
UCF Infielder Kendall Trimm during an at bat in a home game with Buffalo, 2-8-26

UCF Softball's record of excellent performance carried over into the Big-12 Conference, with the Knights playing in their first Big-12 season in 2024. During that season, the Knights won five of their nine conference series (including two sweeps of conference opponents), and Head Coach Cindy Ball-Malone earned her 200th career win at UCF with a road series win at Texas Tech. She also earned her 300th career win overall as a coach that season. At the end of their first season in the Big 12, the Knights placed 5th in the conference behind three teams that made it to that season's Women's College World Series (WCWS) (Oklahoma, Texas, and Oklahoma State); and placing just behind a Baylor team that played in a Super Regional that season. Their 2024 NCAA Tournament appearance was their 4th in a row.

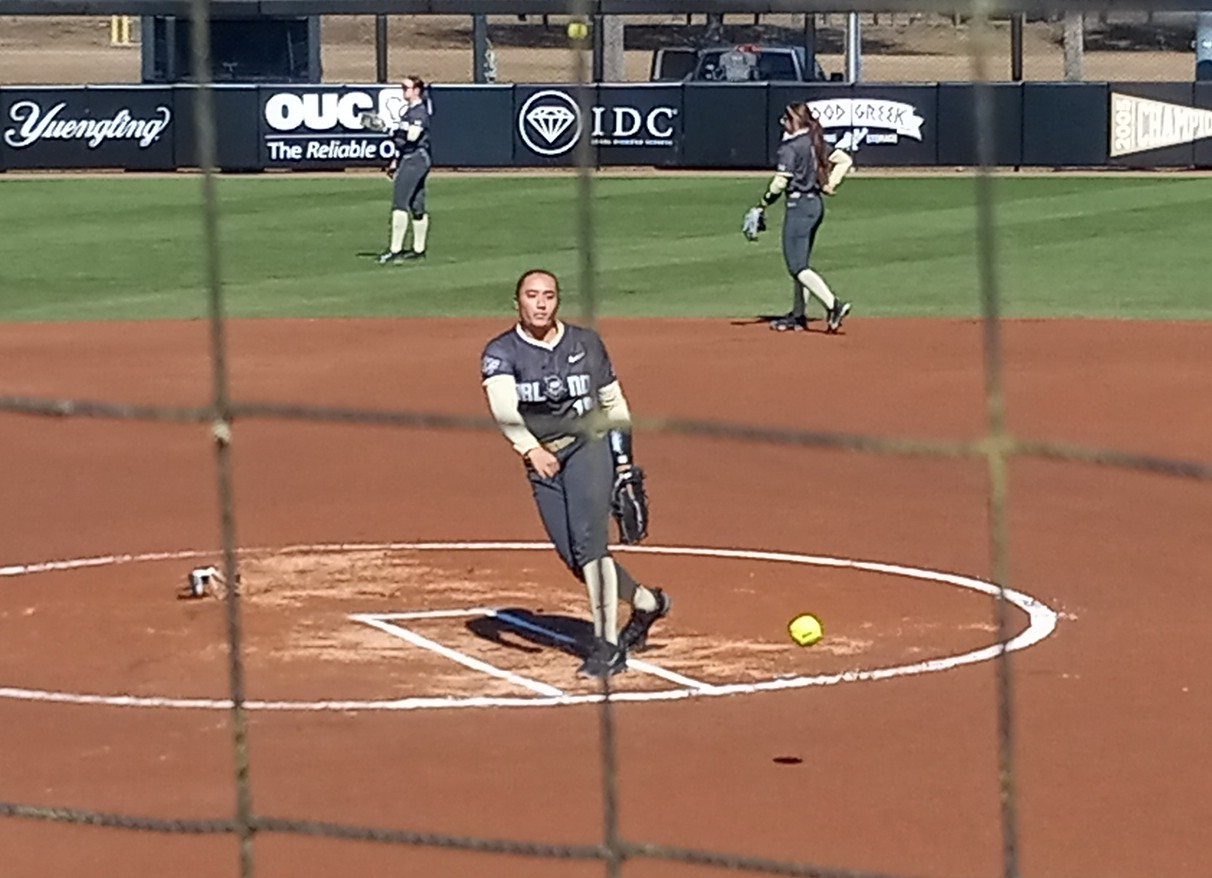
UCF Softball Pitcher Tori Payne during pre-inning warm ups during a home game against Buffalo, 2-8-26.

The story of UCF Knights Shortstop Jasmine Williams also gained national attention during this period. She had been the highest rated recruit in the history of the University of Oregon's Softball program when she started playing there as a Freshman in 2019, but put her college softball career on hold when she became pregnant with her son. Williams had a popular following on social media (up to 100,000 followers), much of it driven by videos she had posted of fun dances she did with one of her Oregon teammates. But after she announced her pregnancy by posting a picture of herself with her baby's father, Williams became the victim of online racial vitriol due to the fact that she was Caucasian and her baby's father was African American. She returned to Oregon to play, but did not see the field in her last season with the Ducks and no longer felt comfortable at Oregon. UCF Coach Ball-Malone had known Williams from their days on the USA U19 National Team (Williams as a player; Ball-Malone as an Assistant Coach), and invited Williams to come to UCF. She would play for two seasons with the Knights (2023–24), earning all-conference honors in 2023. ESPN's Andrea Adelson profiled Williams' story on ESPN in 2024. Williams also appeared in that year's Sports Illustrated Swimsuit Issue, along with other players from women's programs in the Big 12 Conference.

The 2025 season was expected to be a re-build year, as the team was made up of roughly 60% Sophomore and Freshmen players. Despite that, the Knights finished 35-24-1 overall (.500 in conference play), and earned their first road series win against a top-five ranked opponent in program history (winning two out of three games at #4 Arizona). They tacked on four more top-25 wins in the regular season before moving on to their 5th-straight NCAA Tournament appearance, and 3rd regional final in five seasons. They lost in the Austin Regional Final to Texas (who went on to win the College World Series that year). UCF continued their tradition of pitching excellence as well, thanks in large part to Freshman standout Isabella Vega. During her first year with the program, Vega was one of the Big-12's best pitchers (the Big-12's ERA leader in conference play), and by the end of the season earned First Team All-Big 12, D1Softball Freshman All-America First Team, and NFCA All Region First Team honors. Senior Pitcher Kaitlyn Felton also earned All Regional honors and multiple Big 12 Pitcher of the Week awards.

==== UCF on the Rise in the Big 12 ====
The 2026 season saw UCF shatter program records with a team still mostly made up of underclassmen. A total of five UCF batters would break 40 RBI on the season, with three of those breaking 50 RBI. UCF had never had more than one batter break 40 RBI in a single season prior to 2026. These batters also scored double digit homeruns, leading the Knights to collectively score 75 homeruns on the season (breaking the previous UCF single season record of 67 homers). Four of these batters (Sierra Humphreys, Beth Damon, Kendall Yarnell, and Izzy Mertes) became known collectively by two different nicknames (“the Knight Riders” or “the Four Horseman of the Knightpocalypse”) because of their dominant on-base, hits, RBI, and homerun statistics during the season. Joined by Senior Shortstop Aubrey Evans as the fifth +40 RBI batter, these Knights led the team in offensive firepower, while the team as a whole earned an on-base-percentage of .417, which ranked 6th in the nation (and 3rd in the Big 12).

On defense, the Knights were in the top-10 nationally in double plays, while earning a stellar .990 fielding percentage. Samantha Rey (who played most of the season in center field) earned a .969 fielding percentage across 127 total chances, while UCF starting Catcher Beth Damon threw out over 48% of potential base stealers (good for 7th in the nation). UCF fielded a young pitching staff, led by Sophomore (and 2025 All-American) Isabella Vega, who shouldered most of the work for much of the season as the younger pitchers developed. By the end of the season, Vega earned a 1.70 ERA, 110 strikeouts, and a 0.98 WHIP across 135.2 innings. Also by the end of the season, younger pitchers like Tori Payne and Ava Stuewe would begin to shoulder more of the load as their pitching capabilities improved. UCF pitcher Hilde Dempsey, who also showed promise early in the season, suffered a season ending injury just as conference play began in March.

The 2026 season saw the Knights earn 40+ wins for the fourth time in six years (and their first 40 win season since joining the Big 12), as they Knights finished the season 4th in the Big 12 Conference. The Knights won six of their eight conference series in the Big 12, including all four of their conference road series. Three of their conference series wins were against ranked opponents. Highlights of the season included an early season win over #10 LSU, winning their conference series at Oklahoma State (the first Big 12 team to win a regular season series at Oklahoma State since 2015), and securing a series win at Arizona State (who would go on to win the 2026 Big 12 Championship). Both Oklahoma State and Arizona State would go on to win their NCAA Regional Tournaments and appear in Super Regionals at the end of the season.

While playing a conference series at Houston, UCF swept the Cougars in dominant fashion (winning 16-1, 11-0, and 22-8), while shattering program single game records. Three UCF batters scored three home runs in one game (Aubrey Evans in Game One; Sierra Humphreys and Izzy Mertes in Game Three); a feat only accomplished previously by one UCF batter (Stephanie Best in 2003). The Knights also broke a program record of scoring ten home runs in one game (Game Three), becoming the first team to do so in the 2026 season. In Game Two, UCF Pitcher Isabella Vega became just the fourth Knight in program history to pitch a perfect game, striking out seven batters during the matchup.

The Knights earned their 6th NCAA Tournament Regional berth in a row (only one of 20 programs in the nation to do so), going to Tallahassee Regional for the fifth time in program history. UCF edged Jacksonville State in their first game, while host Florida State lost to Stetson in their first game. In the winner’s bracket of the regional, UCF run-ruled Stetson on Saturday to earn a spot in the regional final the next day. Florida State won games against Jacksonville State and Stetson to earn the second spot in the regional final. Florida State (2-1 in the regional) would have to defeat UCF (2-0 in the regional) twice to earn the regional championship, while UCF only had to win once due to the double elimination format of NCAA Regionals. In the first game on Sunday, Florida State edged UCF 2-1, forcing a final winner-take-all game. UCF defeated Florida State 4-2 to earn their first regional championship in Tallahassee, their first regional win over Florida State in program history, and their second all-time NCAA Super Regional berth (their second in five years). The Knights would go on to lose the Super Regional at UCLA, but it was clear that UCF’s softball program had emerged as one of the top programs in the Big 12 Conference and was a rising power in NCAA Division I Softball.

== Championships and NCAA Tournaments ==
Conference Regular Season Championships
Year	Conference	Head Coach	Regular Season Conference Record
2014	American Athletic Conference	Renee Luers-Gillispie	15-3
2015	American Athletic Conference	Renee Luers-Gillispie	16-2
2022	American Athletic Conference	Cindy Ball-Malone	16-2

Conference Tournament Championships
Year	Conference	Head Coach	Tournament Championship Game
2005	Atlantic Sun Conference	Renee Luers-Gillispie	UCF 3, Troy 1
2008	Conference-USA	Renee Luers-Gillispie	UCF 4, Houston 2
2015	American Athletic Conference	Renee Luers-Gillispie	UCF 1, Tulsa 0
2022	American Athletic Conference	Cindy Ball-Malone	UCF 11, South Florida 0 (5 innings)
2023	American Athletic Conference	Cindy Ball-Malone	UCF 9, Tulsa 1 (5 innings)

NCAA Tournament Super Regionals
Year	Head Coach	Tournament Record	Notes
2022	Cindy Ball-Malone	0-2	Lost to Oklahoma (Host)
2026	Cindy Ball-Malone	0-2	Lost to UCLA (Host)

NCAA Tournament Regionals
Year	Head Coach	Tournament Record	Notes
2005	Renee Luers-Gillispie	1-2	Gainesville Regional
2008	Renee Luers-Gillispie	3-2	Gainesville Regional Final
2010	Renee Luers-Gillispie	1-2	Gainesville Regional
2012	Renee Luers-Gillispie	0-2	Gainesville Regional
2014	Renee Luers-Gillispie	2-2	Gainesville Regional Final
2015	Renee Luers-Gillispie	2-2	Tallahassee Regional Final
2016	Renee Luers-Gillispie	2-2	Gainesville Regional
2021	Cindy Ball-Malone	2-2	Tallahassee Regional Final
2022	Cindy Ball-Malone	3-0	Orlando Regional Champion
2023	Cindy Ball-Malone	1-2	Tallahassee Regional
2024	Cindy Ball-Malone	1-2	Tallahassee Regional
2025	Cindy Ball-Malone	2-2	Austin Regional Final
2026	Cindy Ball-Malone	3-1	Tallahassee Regional Champion

== Rivalries ==
=== University of Houston ===
The University of Houston Cougars are UCF's oldest conference rival in Softball, as the two programs have met each other on the field almost every year since 2006, and have shared membership in three different conferences over those years (Conference-USA, American Athletic Conference, Big 12 Conference). The two teams first played a three-game conference series in Orlando in 2006, which saw the Cougars sweep the Knights on the latter's home field. Houston dominated the Knights in their first years of conference play, winning eight of the first ten meetings between the two programs. The Knights won their first series against the Cougars in 2009 in Houston, before Houston swept UCF once again in Orlando the next season. The two programs traded conference series sweeps over the next two seasons, as the Knights took down the Cougars in Houston in 2011 before Houston defeated UCF in Orlando in 2012.

After the two programs joined the American Athletic Conference for the 2014 Softball season, the Knights dominated the Cougars for their first three years in the conference, winning eight of the nine games played in those series. But Houston came back in 2017 to take the series in Orlando against the Knights 2-1, which also marked the first regular season conference series loss for the Knights since joining the American Conference three years earlier. The two programs traded series wins over the next two seasons, but the Cougars' 2019 series victory against the Knights would be Houston's last against UCF as of the 2026 season. During their last years in the American Conference between 2021 and 2023, UCF won eleven of the last twelve games the two teams played as members of that conference (both during the regular season and in conference championship tournaments). This included a 2023 home series sweep by the Knights in Orlando, which saw UCF pitcher Sarah Willis pitch a perfect game against the Cougars in game one of the series.

UCF's period of dominance over Houston followed the two programs into the Big 12 Conference, as the Knights won every Big 12 Conference series against the Cougars as of the 2026 season (winning eight of the nine games played in those series). This included a dominant series sweep by UCF in Houston during the 2026 season, as the Knights defeated the Cougars 16-1, 11-0, and 22-8. During game two, UCF pitcher Isabella Vega pitched a perfect game against Houston; the first perfect outing for a Knights pitcher since Sarah Willis' performance against the Cougars in 2023. In the final game of the 2026 series, UCF set a program record of ten home runs scored in one game.

Overall series record: UCF 39 wins, Houston 24 wins.

=== University of South Florida (the war on I-4) ===
The UCF Knights have had a long time rivalry with the University of South Florida Bulls, whose campus is 90 miles from Orlando in Tampa. This rivalry, known as "the War on I-4" (named for the interstate highway that connects Orlando and Tampa), has encompassed all sports played by both schools, but it has been just as intense in Softball as it has in any other sport played by the two rival universities. The two softball teams played their first game against each other in 2003, with the Bulls winning the first eight games in the series before the Knights notched their first win against Bulls in 2006.

When UCF and South Florida were both members of the American Athletic Conference, both schools developed an all sports "War on I-4" trophy that would be awarded to one of the two schools on an annual basis based on their head-to-head record in all sports played that year.

During the American Athletic Conference years, the Knights came to dominate the series against the Bulls by a 22 to 10 margin, including 12 straight wins by UCF in the series before the Knights left the conference at the end of the 2023 season. During these years, the Knights defeated the Bulls twice by run rule, but also played 3 extra inning games which saw the Knights win 2 of the 3 matchups.

The final game in the series as of 2025 was in the 2023 American Athletic Conference Softball Tournament, which saw the Knights take down the Bulls 2–0 in the conference semi-final game. Since the Knights have joined the Big 12 Conference, the rivalry is now dormant as there are no future games on the schedule between the two teams as of the end of the 2025 season.

Overall series record: UCF 24 wins, South Florida 19 wins.

=== University of Florida ===
The UCF Knights Softball program and the University of Florida Gators Softball program have a long history of playing each other, going back to the 2003 season. Although the Gators have dominated the series by a 27 to 7 margin, the Knights have been able to score periodic wins over the Gators during the course of the series (the first in 2005). In more recent years, the Knights have closed the margin, winning three of the past nine matchups in the series. This included a dramatic walk-off 8–6 win by the Knights in Orlando in 2021, with the winning two-run home run scored by UCF Catcher Karissa Ornelas. In 2025, the Knights took down the Gators 4–0 in a regular season meeting in Orlando. The two teams play each other during the regular season most years, and have often met up in NCAA Regional Tournaments. Both UCF Coach Cindy Ball-Malone and Florida Coach Tim Walton have expressed a desire to continue the series on a regular basis as much as scheduling conflicts will allow.

Overall series record: Florida 27 wins, UCF 7 wins.

=== Florida Atlantic University ===
The UCF and Florida Atlantic University (FAU) Softball programs have the longest history of any of UCF's in-state rivalries, with the two teams first squaring off in UCF's first softball season (2002). In the period from 2002 to 2008, the Owls owned a winning record over the Knights, winning the series during that period by a 13 to 6 margin. The series was dormant from 2008 until 2014, when the two teams resumed their series. The two programs have played each other in most years since that time, with alternating home and away games played once a year. Since 2014, the Knights have turned the tables on the Owls, with UCF dominating the series by a 12 to 2 margin. The Knights have won the last ten matchups in the series, including a 3–0 road win over the then #22 ranked Owls on FAU's home field in Boca Raton during the 2025 season. UCF won the most recent meeting with FAU in 2026; a midweek 9-5 home victory over the Owls.

Overall series record: UCF 18 wins, FAU 15 wins.

== Stadium ==
UCF's home field is the UCF Softball Complex, which opened in 2006. Known as "the Plex", the facility has a normal seating capacity of 600 within the facility, but also has seating beyond the outfield fence to accommodate additional fans. There is also a contingent of fans who regularly attend games with their RV's and campers, and park beyond the outfield fence and watch the games. Known unofficially as the "Left Field Lounge", these fans will set up tailgating tents, grills for cooking out, and a big screen TV to monitor the broadcast of the games.

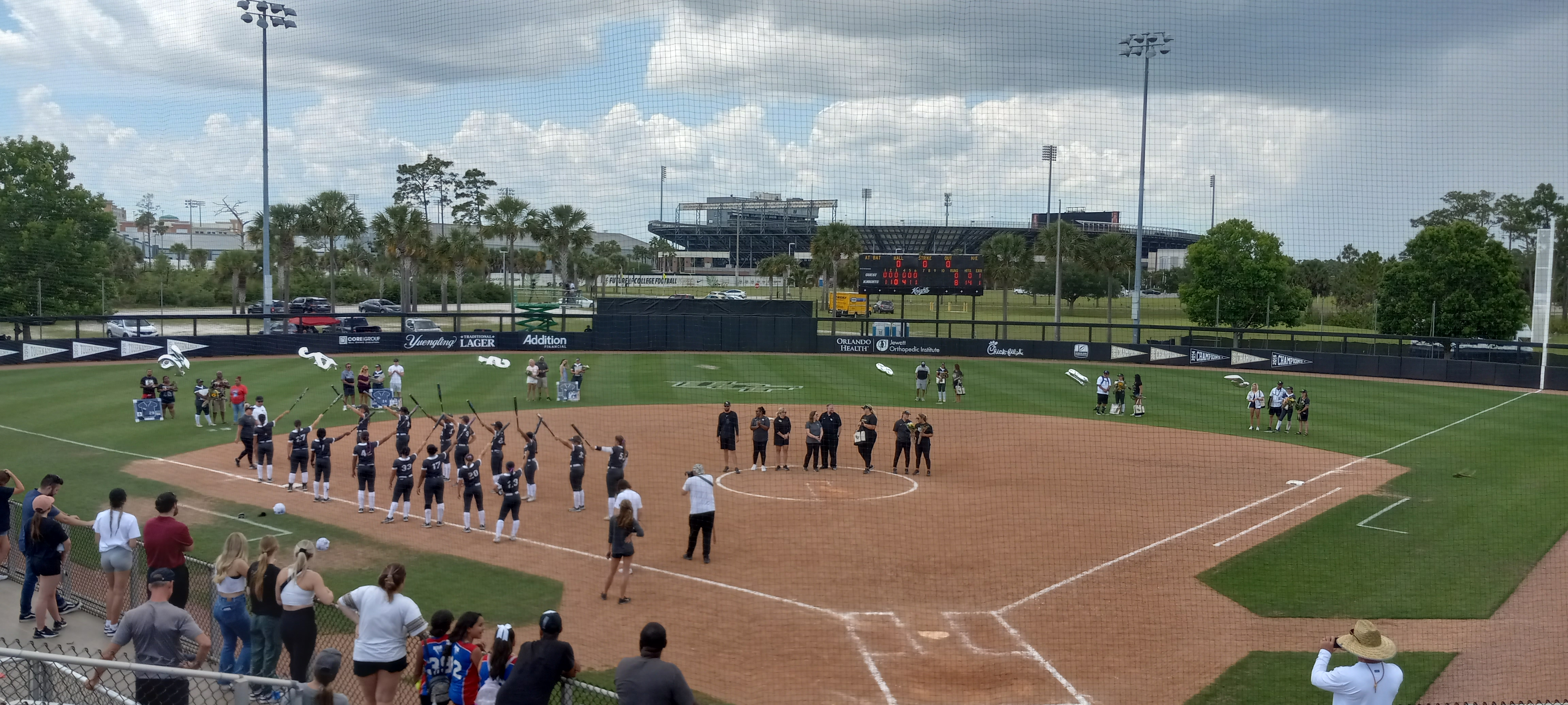
UCF Softball Complex on Senior Day, 2022.

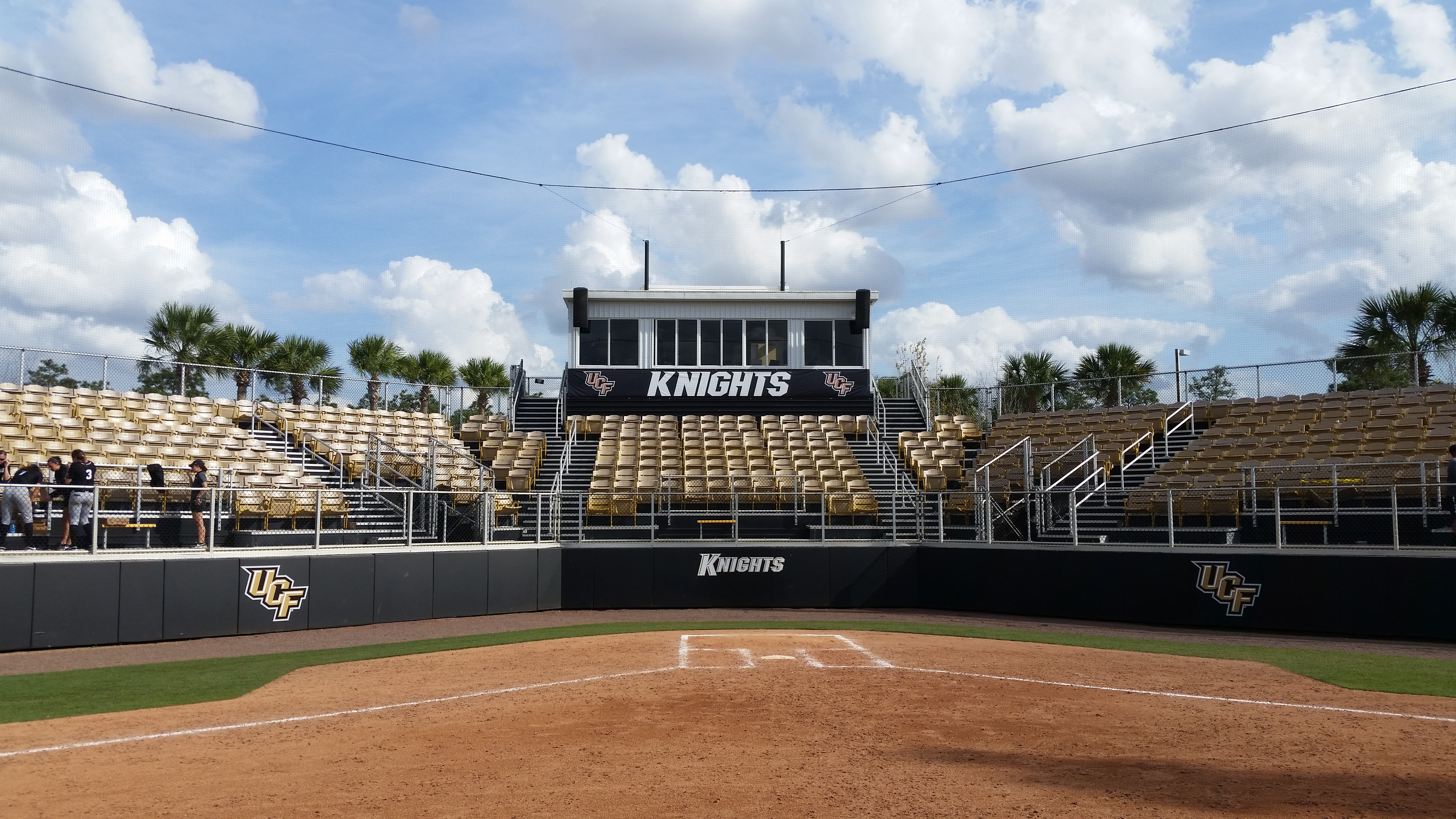
Stands at the UCF Softball Complex after upgrades to seating were made in 2017.

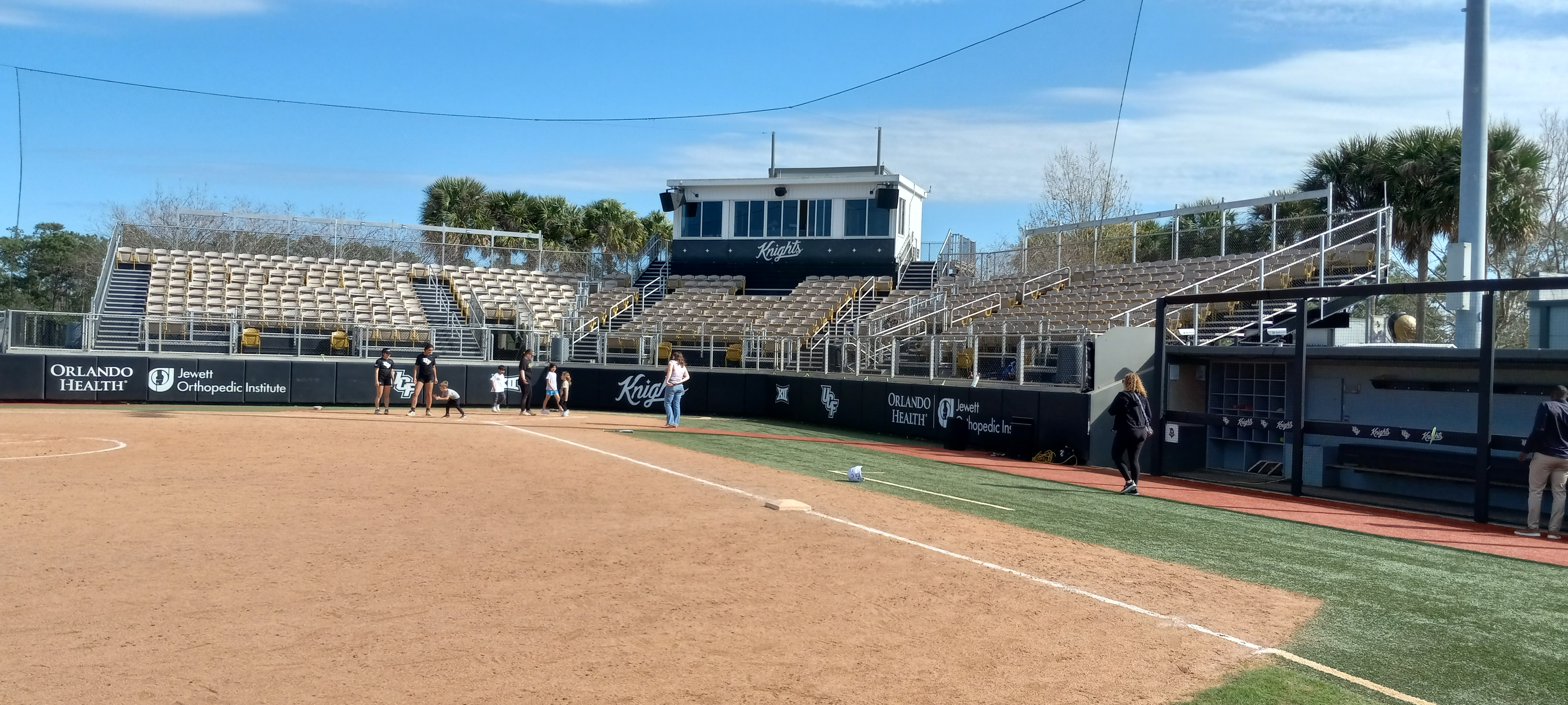
Main seating section and tower at the UCF Softball Complex in 2024.

In 2021, the Plex received major renovations, which included upgrades to the locker rooms, training facilities, staff offices, and the outfield. New seating was installed in the stands as well, upgrading from metal benches to chair back seating. These seats were replaced once again in 2024 with newer chair back seating. Major upgrades have also been made over the years to the field turf, and state-of-the-art Yakkertech technology has been added to the stadium to allow for better data tracking on ball movement on the field during the games. Instant replay cameras and review equipment have also been added and upgraded over the past few years to allow officials to better review calls during games. Behind the seating sections (beyond home plate) is a media tower for in stadium Public Address Announcer, as well as radio and television media live coverage of the games. Most UCF home games are broadcast on ESPN related networks due to media agreements between ESPN and the Big 12 Conference.

In 2022, temporary seating was added to the stadium for the NCAA Regional Tournament hosted by the Knights that season. The temporary seating sections were added behind both the home and visiting dugouts, as well as behind the outfield fence behind the first baseline. During the tournament, the complex hosted 3,000 fans, including more than 1,200 fans that attended the tournament final which saw UCF defeat Michigan to advance to Super Regional round of the NCAA Tournament.

Along the outfield wall are banners celebrating UCF's history of conference championships and NCAA Tournament appearances. In the stadium concourse, banners are on display honoring past UCF players who have been inducted into the UCF Athletics Hall of Fame. The stadium concourse also features food/drink and fan merchandise concessions.

Future plans call for further upgrades to the facility, including additional seating, an awning over the main seating sections, upgrades and expansion to outfield seating, a second level concourse behind the main seating section, and upgrades to the media tower.

== Traditions and annual tournaments ==
The UCF Knights Softball program has developed a number of traditions that have been passed down through the years. Before the game, during the National Anthem, when the song reaches segment that includes the lyrics "gave proof through the night", UCF fans will typically shout the word "NIGHT" in unison in reference to Knights team name. This is a common practice across UCF sports that started at UCF football games during the 1990's. During the game, when the Knights score a run, UCF fans are encouraged to engage in the "U-C-F" chant/cheer to celebrate the run. When a home-run is scored, the public address system will play the Zombie Nation "Kernkraft 400" song, which is commonly played at all UCF sporting events. Fans will often engage in the song's sports chant, with each chant ending with "U-C-F-Knights". When a Knights pitcher records a strikeout, the public address system will typically play the "fireball" chorus from Pitbull's song, "Fireball."

Before the games, when UCF players line up for the National Anthem, they will often be joined by a local softball little league team from the Central Florida region. Known as "softball buddies", the visiting little league players will join the Knights players on the field and stand with them for the anthem. The players will also get a tour of the UCF facility, and get to spend time with the UCF players before the game.

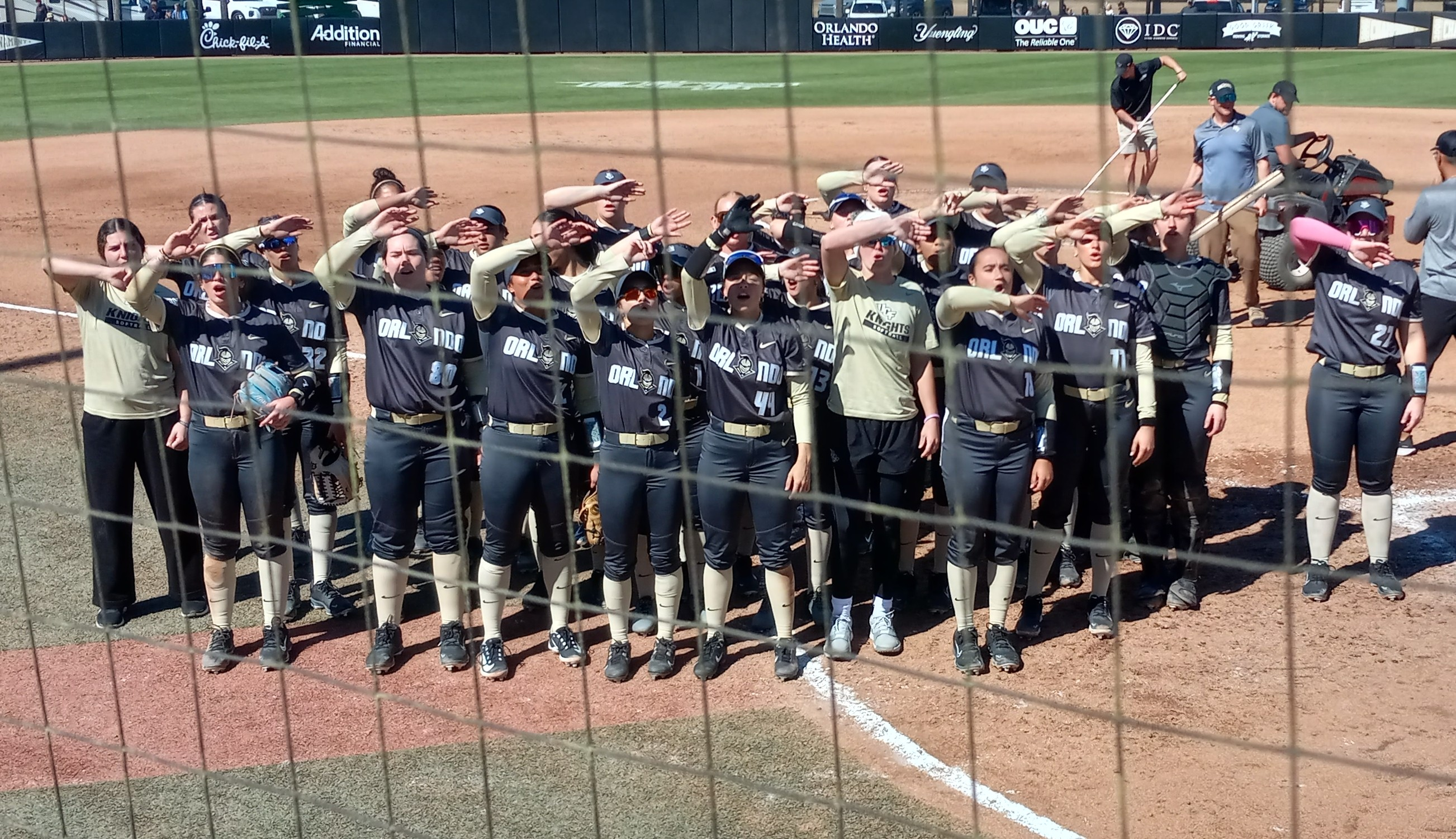
UCF Softball players wearing the "Orlando" home city pride jerseys during the post-game "Knights' Noble Chant" after a run-rule win over Buffalo, 2-8-26.

A longstanding stadium ritual for players and fans known as the "Knights' Noble Chant" occurs after the team wins a home victory. After the game ends, the players will gather on the field in front of the stands and will engage in the chant (which is a common ritual for Knights fans in all UCF sports), and will be joined in the chant by many fans in the stands to celebrate the victory.

Many UCF traditions are also connected to the variety of uniforms worn by the team during games. The typical uniforms worn by players include an all black uniform combination with black jersey (with the word "Knights" printed in script across the front) and black pants; the alternate all-white uniforms of the same script design as the all black uniforms; and the black and gold pinstripe uniforms (again with the same script design). The Knights also have the "Orlando" home city pride uniforms, with the name of the team's home city emblazoned on the front of the jersey. The Knights' uniform selections also used to include a gold jersey and white pants combination, but this has not appeared on the field in recent years.

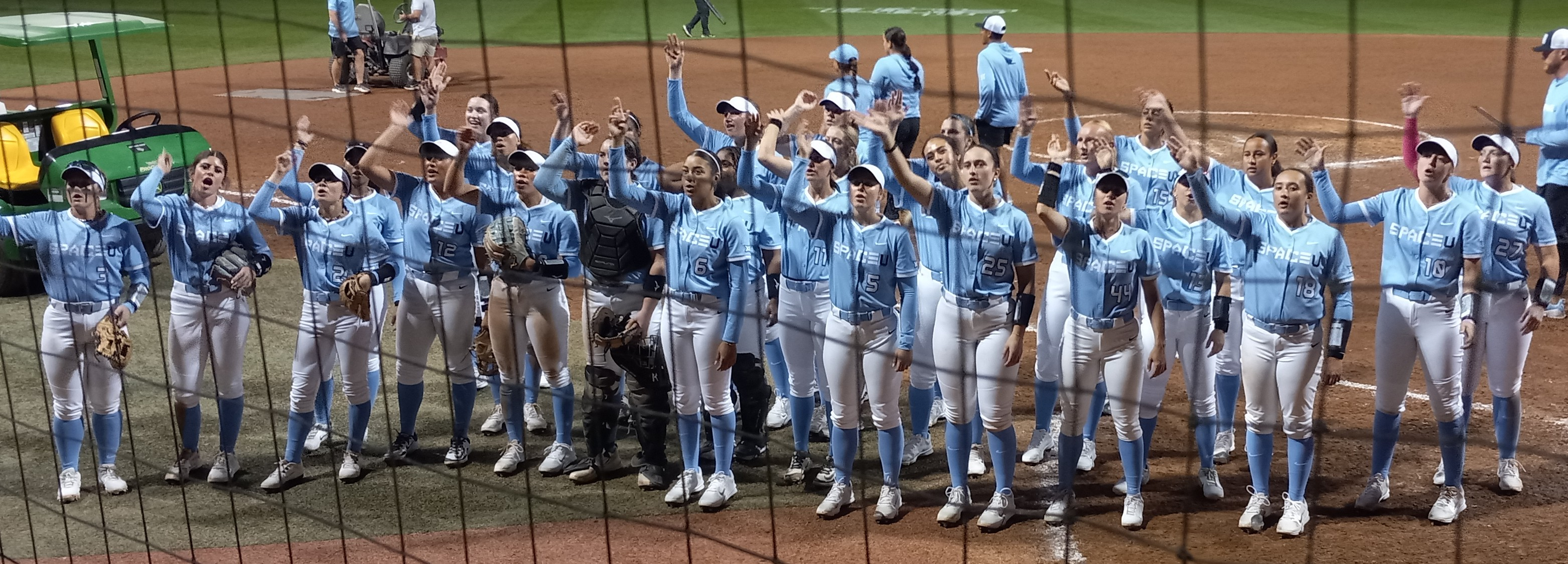
UCF Softball players wearing their "Space Game" uniforms from a 2026 home win over Notre Dame, 2-21-26.

There are also several themed games that the Knights play every year. Several games a year will be designated as "Space Games" for the Knights, honoring UCF's connections to the U.S. space program. The University of Central Florida was originally founded as Florida Technological University in the 1960's to support the burgeoning American space efforts on the Florida coast. To this day, there are more UCF graduates working for NASA than graduates of any other university in America. To honor the school's space related heritage, the Knights will wear an alternate black or light blue (referred to as "Canaveral Blue") jersey with a logo reading "Space U" printed on the jersey.

Another themed game for the Knights is the annual Autism Awareness Game, during which UCF players will wear special Autism Awareness Jerseys. This game is normally played near the beginning of April to coincide with Autism Awareness Day. During the first inning of the game, the Knights and the visiting team will play with no music and no public address announcements, with sound slowly being added throughout the game, in deference to those on the spectrum who have high sensory sensitivity. Before the game, fidget toys designed to help those on the spectrum are also given away in the stadium concourse.

UCF Softball typically hosts three annual tournaments towards the early part of the season. The first is the "Black and Gold Classic", usually played on the first weekend, to be followed in later weekends by the "Space U Classic" and the "Charge On Classic" (referring to the common UCF sports slogan of "Go Knights, Charge On"). At each of these tournaments, UCF will host up to five other teams who will all play each other in a round-robin format. The teams will usually be a mix of programs from the other three power-four conferences (SEC, Big-10, or ACC), as well as teams from other conferences such as the Ohio Valley Conference, the Ivy League, and the West Coast Conference.

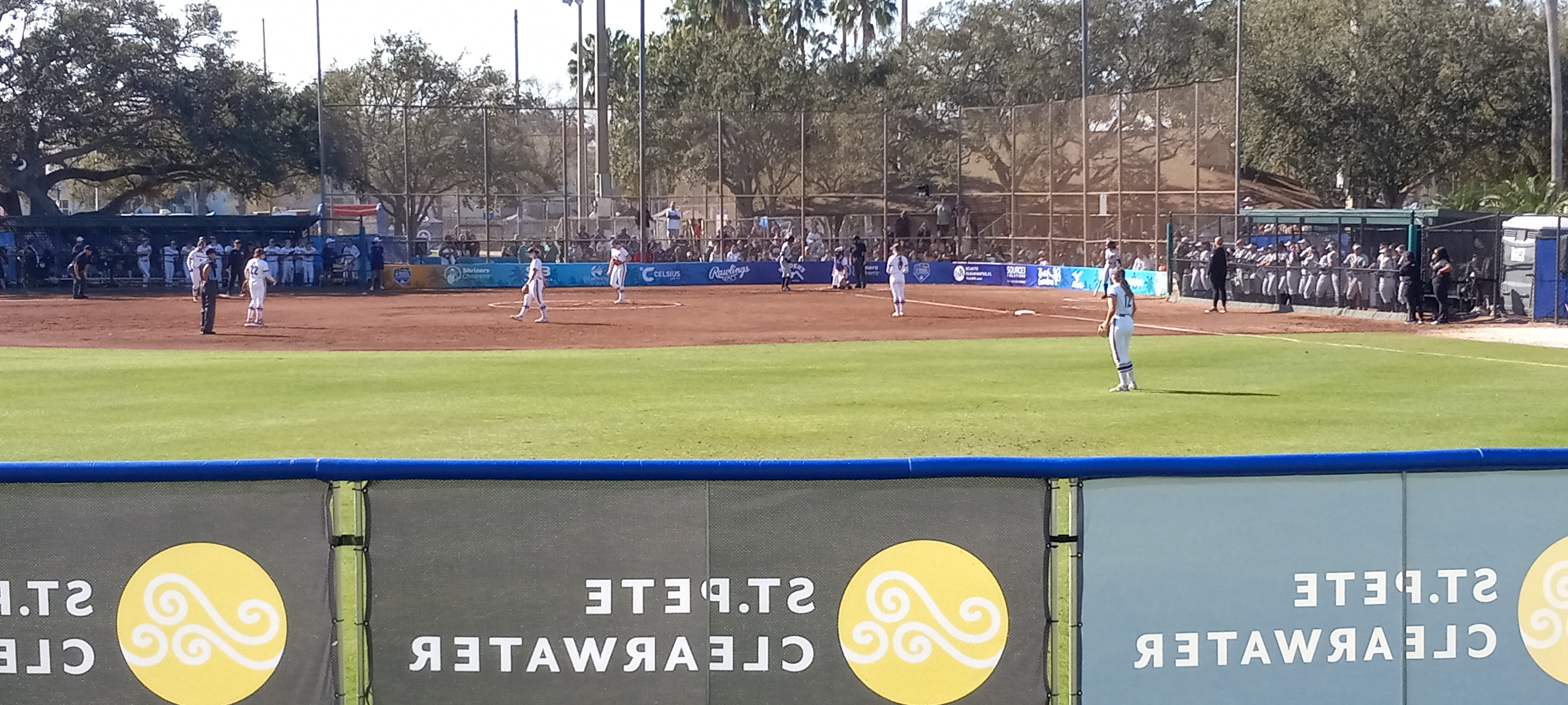
UCF Softball playing against Northwestern in a 6-4 Knights victory from the 2026 Shriners Clearwater Invitational Tournament.

The Knights will typically play in various tournaments around the country. UCF has been one of the most frequent programs to participate in the annual Shriners Children's Clearwater Invitational tournament, having played in the tournament every year starting in 2022. The tournament features sixteen college softball teams from around the nation, with the tournament played at the Eddie C. Moore Softball Complex in Clearwater, Florida. UCF used to travel to California for tournaments during their days in the American Athletic Conference, but have not done so since joining the Big 12.

== Coaches ==
Tenure	Coach	Years	Record	Pct.
2002–2018	Renee Luers-Gillispie	17	625–403–1	.608
2019–present	Cindy Ball-Malone	8	292-148-4	.662
Totals	2 coaches	25 seasons	917-551-5	.626
Records are through the beginning of the 2026 NCAA Regular Season.

=== Coaching honors ===
Renee Luers-Gillispie:

- American Athletic Conference Coach of the Year (2017)

Cindy Ball-Malone:

- Extra Innings Softball National Coach of the Year (2022)
- American Athletic Conference Coach of the Year (2022)

UCF Softball Coaching Staff Collective Awards:

- American Athletic Conference Coaching Staff of the Year (2014, 2015, 2022)
- ATEC/NFCA Mideast Region Coaching Staff of the Year (2015, 2022)
- ATEC/NFCA Gulf Region Coaching Staff of the Year (2026)

== Individual Player Honors and Awards ==
=== All-American honors ===
A Softball All-American designation identifies elite youth or collegiate players recognized for outstanding performance, typically representing the top talent in the nation.

- Stephanie Best: 2005 ESPN the Magazine First Team All-American
- Mackenzie Audas: 2015 Capital One First Team All-American
- Shelby Turnier: 2015 NFCA Division I First Team All-American
- Jada Cody: 2022 D1Softball First Team All-American & Softball America Second Team All-American
- Isabella Vega: 2025 D1Softball Freshman First Team All-American & Softball America Freshman First Team All-American
- Beth Damon: 2025 D1Softball Freshman Second Team All-American
- Sierra Humphreys: 2026 NFCA Division I Third Team All-American

=== National Player of the Week Awards ===
- Stephanie Best: Louisville Slugger National Player of the Week (March 19, 2003); NFCA National Player of the Week (March 19, 2003)
- Shelby Turnier: NFCA National Pitcher of the Week (February 17, 2015); USA Softball National Pitcher of the Week (February 17, 2015); espnW National Player of the Week (February 18, 2015)
- Jada Cody: D1 Softball National Player of the Week (March 30, 2021)
- Sarah Willis: Wilson National Pitcher of the Week (May 2, 2023); NFCA National Division I Pitcher of the Week (May 2, 2023)
- Isabella Vega: D1Softball National Freshman of the Week (April 1, 2025); Wilson National Pitcher of the Week (May 6, 2025); NFCA National Pitcher of the Week (May 6, 2025); Sports Illustrated National Pitcher of the Week (March 11, 2026)
- Sierra Humphreys: D1Softball National Player of the Week (May 5, 2026)

==== Other National Recognitions ====
- Stephanie Best: NCAA Woman Athlete of the Year (2005 nominee)
- Cici Alvarez: NCAA Division I Softball Statistical Champion (2007 winner)
- Shelby Turnier: USA Softball Collegiate Player of the Year (2015 finalist)
- Jada Cody: USA Softball Collegiate Player of the Year (2023 Watchlist)
- Isabella Vega: NFCA Division I National Freshman of the Year (2025 finalist)

=== NFCA All-Region Team selections ===
The NFCA All-Region Team recognizes elite softball student-athletes across 10 regions in NCAA Divisions I, II, III, NAIA, and high school, selected by National Fastpitch Coaches Association member coaches. These awards, usually announced in May, highlight top performers (1st, 2nd, and 3rd teams) who become eligible for All-American honors.

- 2002: Jania Shinhoster (Southeast Region First Team); Dottie Cup (Southeast Region Second Team)
- 2003: Stephanie Best (Southeast Region First Team)
- 2004: Stephanie Best (Southeast Region Second Team)
- 2005: Stephanie Best, Lindsay Enders (Southeast Region Second Team)
- 2007: Allison Kime (Southeast Region First Team)
- 2008: Allison Kime (Southeast Region First Team)
- 2009: Breanne Javier (Mideast Region First Team)
- 2010: Ashleigh Cole (Central Region Second Team)
- 2012: Natalie Land (Mideast Region First Team); Mackenzie Audas (Mideast Region Second Team)
- 2014: Kahley Novak (Mideast Region First Team); Farrah Sullivan (Mideast Region Second Team); Shelby Turnier (Mideast Region Third Team)
- 2015: Shelby Turnier, Kahley Novak (Mideast Region First Team); Mackenzie Audas, Jessica Ujvari (Mideast Region Second Team); Brittany Solis, Linnea Goodman (Mideast Region Third Team)
- 2016: Shelby Turnier (Mideast Region First Team); Courtney Rotton (Mideast Region Third Team)
- 2017: Linnea Goodman (Mideast Regionl Third Team)
- 2018: Alea White, Cassady Brewer (Mideast Region First Team)
- 2019: Alea White (Mideast Region First Team); Cassady Brewer (Mideast Region Second Team); Breanna Vasquez (Mideast Region Third Team)
- 2021: Alea White (Mideast Region First Team); Jazmine Esparza (Mideast Region Second Team); Gianna Mancha, Jada Cody (Mideast Region Third Team)
- 2022: Gianna Mancha (Mideast Region First Team); Jada Cody (Mideast Region Second Team)
- 2023: Sarah Willis (Mideast Region First Team); Grace Jewell (Mideast Region Second Team); Aubrey Evans (Mideast Region Third Team)
- 2024: Jada Cody (Midwest Region First Team); Sarah Willis (Midwest Region Second Team)
- 2025: Isabella Vega (Gulf Region First Team); Izzy Mertes (Gulf Region Second Team); Aubrey Evans (Gulf Region Third Team)
- 2026: Sierra Humphreys (Gulf Region First Team); Isabella Vega, Beth Damon, Kendall Yarnell (Gulf Region Second Team); Izzy Mertes (Gulf Region Third Team)

=== Conference honorees ===
Conference Player of the Year Awards:

- Stephanie Best (3x Atlantic Sun/A-SUN Conference Player of the Year; 2003, 2004, 2005)
- Farrah Sullivan (2014 American Athletic Conference Player of the Year)
- Jessica Ujvari (2015 American Athletic Conference Player of the Year)

Conference Pitcher of the Year Awards:

- Mackenzie Audas (Conference-USA 2012)
- Shelby Turnier (American Athletic Conference 2015)
- Gianna Mancha (American Athletic Conference 2022)
- Sarah Willis (American Athletic Conference 2023)

Conference Defensive Player of the Year Awards:

- Justene Molina (American Athletic Conference 2022)

Conference Freshman/Rookie Player of the Year Awards:

- Amber Lamb (Atlantic Sun/A-SUN Conference 2004)
- Mackenzie Audas (Conference-USA 2012)
- Cassady Brewer (American Athletic Conference 2016)
- Micaela Macario (American Athletic Conference 2022)

Conference Newcomer of the Year Awards:

- Marquita Council (Conference-USA 2008)
- Ali Schmidt (Conference-USA 2012)

Conference Hall-of-Fame Inductees:

- Stephanie Best (Atlantic Sun/A-SUN Hall of Fame, 2022 Class)

=== All Conference players ===
Softball all-conference is a prestigious postseason honor recognizing the best-performing players within a specific athletic league or conference, voted on by coaches. It highlights top talent (first, second, or freshman teams) for their performance that season.

Year	First Team	Second Team	Freshman/Rookie Team
(Atlantic Sun Conference) (2002–2005)
2002	Dottie Cupp, Jania Shinhoster	Stephanie Best	
2003	Dottie Cupp, Stephanie Best		
2004	Stephanie Best, Janine Shinhoster	Janey Solano, Ashley Van Ryan	Amber Lamb
2005	Stephanie Best, Lindsay Enders, Cici Alvarez	Allison Krayer, Janell Timms	Cat Snapp, Cici Alvarez
(Conference-USA) (2006–2013)
2006	Allison Kime		Breanne Javier
2007	Allison Kime, Kacie Feaster, Breanne Javier		Hillary Barrow
2008	Allison Kime, Breanne Javier		Tiffany Lane, Abby McClain
2009	Tiffany Lane	Breanne Javier	
2010	Tiffany Lane, Natalie Land, Ashleigh Cole	Abby McClain	
2011	Natalie Land	Tiffany Lane	Marissa Menendez
2012	Natalie Land, Mackenzie Audas	Farrah Sullivan, Vanessa Perez	Mackenzie Audas, Farrah Sullivan, Kahley Novak, Hayley Barrow
2013			Shelby Turnier, Taylor Wagner
(American Athletic Conference) (2014–2023)
2014	Farrah Sullivan, Shelby Turnier	Mackenzie Audas, Jessica Ujvari, Linnea Goodman	
2015	Mackenzie Audas, Shelby Turnier, Kahley Novak, Farrah Sullivan, Linnea Goodman, Maddy Schroeder, Jessica Ujvari	Brittany Solis	
2016	Shelby Turnier, Samantha McCloskey, Cassady Brewer	Jamie Ujvari, Kalyn Cenal, Courtney Rotton, Jessica Ujvari	Cassady Brewer
2017	Cassady Brewer	Jasmine Esparza, Alea White, Courtney Rotton	Alea White, Kyra Klarkowski, Autumn Gillespie
2018	Cassady Brewer, Denali Scappacher	Alea White, Megan Greenwell, Erin Emanuel	Denali Schappacher
2019	Alea White	Cassady Brewer	Damaria Cannon, Karissa Ornellas, Breanna Vasquez
2020	Covid Year-No Honors Awarded by Conference		
2021	Jada Cody, Jazmine Esparza, Denali Schappacher, Alea White	Shannon Doherty, Kyra Klarkowski, Gianna Mancha, Karissa Ornellas	Kennedy Searcy, Jada Cody, Juliana Wilson
2022	Kennedy Searcy, Jada Cody, Justene Molina, Gianna Mancha, Denali Schappacher	Kama Woodall, Ashleigh Griffin, Micaela Macario	Ashleigh Griffin, Micaela Macario
2023	Sarah Willis, Jada Cody, Shannon Doherty, Micaela Macario, Kennedy Searcy	Chloe Evans, Jasmine Williams, Aubrey Evans	Aubrey Evans
(Big 12 Conference) (2024–Present)
2024	Sarah Willis	Shannon Doherty, Chloe Evans	Sierra Humphreys, Samantha Rey
2025	Isabella Vega	Aubrey Evans, Sierra Humphreys	Isabella Vega, Izzy Mertes, Beth Damon
2026	Sierra Humphreys, Isabella Vega	Beth Damon, Aubrey Evans, Izzy Mertes, Samantha Rey	

=== Conference Weekly Honors and Awards ===
Conference Player of the Week awards in softball are weekly honors handed out by athletic conferences to recognize the most outstanding individual performances by student-athletes across their member teams. These awards typically highlight exceptional statistical achievements in batting, pitching, or overall team impact during the previous week of play. Conference weekly honors include: Player of the Week, Pitcher of the Week, Batter of the Week, Freshman (Rookie) of the Week, and Weekly Honor Roll.

As of 2026, the top five players in UCF Softball history with the most weekly conference honors/awards are:

- Shelby Turnier (11)
- Alea White (9)
- Stephanie Best and MacKenzie Audas (7 each)
- Allison Kime (5)

Conference Weekly Honors and Awards (Various)
Year	Players
(Atlantic Sun Conference) (2002–2005)
2002	Stephanie Best, Jania Shinhoster
2003	Stephanie Best (x3)
2004	Stephanie Best (x2)
2005	Stephanie Best, Crystle Krafft
(Conference-USA) (2006–2013)
2006	Allison Kime (x2)
2007	Allison Kime, Hillary Barrow, Ashleigh Cole
2008	Allison Kime (x2), Tiffany Lane
2009	Ashleigh Cole, Tiffany Lane, Abby McClain
2010	Ashleigh Cole
2011	Tawny Swan
2012	Mackenzie Audas (x3)
2013	Mackenzie Audas, Shelby Turnier, Taylor Wagner
(American Athletic Conference) (2014–2023)
2014	Mackenzie Audas (x2), Shelby Turnier (x2), Kahley Novak, Farrah Sullivan
2015	Mackenzie Audas, Shelby Turnier (x5), Jessica Ujvari (x2)
2016	Shelby Turnier (x3), Courtney Rotton (x2)
2017	Courtney Rotton, Cassady Brewer
2018	Alea White (x3)
2019	Alea White (x4), Cassady Brewer (x3)
2020	Alea White (x2), Justene Molina, Jada Cody
2021	Jada Cody, Jazmine Esparza
2022	Jada Cody (x2), Justene Moline, Micaela Macario
2023	Shannon Doherty (x2), Aubrey Evans (x2), Sarah Willis (x2) Savannah Adams, Chloe Evans, Kaitlyn Felton
(Big 12 Conference) (2024–Present)
2024	Ashleigh Griffin, Sarah Willis
2025	Kaitlyn Felton, Isabella Vega
2026	Isabella Vega, Sierra Humphreys, Hildie Dempsey, Ava Stuewe

== UCF Athletics Hall of Fame Inductees and Order of Pegasus ==
Established in 1998, the UCF Athletics Hall of Fame honors former student-athletes, coaches, and contributors who achieved excellence in their sports or made significant contributions to the University of Central Florida's athletic programs. It recognizes decorated individuals who have left a lasting legacy on the Knights' history.

Players (Name and Year Inducted):

- Stephanie Best (2015)
- Allison Kime (2019)
- Natalie Land (2021)
- Mackenzie Audas (2022)
- Shelby Turnier (2023)

=== Order of Pegasus ===
Order of Pegasus is the highest honor a student can receive at the University of Central Florida for academic achievement, leadership, and community service.

- Shelly Frick (2010)
- Shannon Doherty (2023)
- Jada Cody (2024)

.

== Knights in Professional Softball ==
There have been three professional softball leagues to field teams in the U.S., and former Knights have played for all three of these leagues. The first was the National Pro Fastpitch league, which operated from 1997 until the league folded in 2021 due to Covid-era related play interruptions. The Women's Professional Fastpitch (WPF) league was founded in 2022 as the successor to the National Pro Fastpitch league. In 2024, the Athletes Unlimited (AU) softball league was founded as a rival to the WPF.

National Pro Fastpitch:

- Stephanie Best
- Allison Kime
- Breanne Javier
- Shelby Turnier
- Kahley Novak
- Samantha McCloskey

Women's Professional Fastpitch (WPF):

- Gianna Mancha
- Stormy Kotzelnick
- Kaitlyn Felton
- Jada Cody
- Sona Halajian

Athletes Unlimited (AU) Softball League:

- Sarah Willis

Professional Softball League (PSL):

- Chloe Evans

== Knights on national softball/baseball teams ==
National softball teams are elite squads representing their country in international competitions like the Olympics, WBSC World Cups, and Pan American Games. Governed by national bodies, these teams, including Women's, Men's, and youth programs, are selected from top athlete pools to compete at the highest level. The United States women's national baseball team represents the United States in international women's baseball competitions. It is controlled by USA Baseball and is a member of the WBSC Americas.

U.S. National Softball Team:

- Abby McClain
- Jada Cody
- Jasmine Williams

Great Britain Women's National Softball Team:

- Katie Burge

Sweden Women's National Softball Team:

- Linnea Goodman

Israel Women's National Softball Team:

- Ava Justman

Puerto Rico Women's National Softball Team:

- Gianna Mancha
- Isabella Vega
- Yessenia Lopez

U.S. Women's National Baseball Team:

- Natalie Land

== Former Knights players on NCAA coaching staffs ==
A number of former UCF softball players have pursued a career in coaching collegiate softball. The following is a partial listing of former Knights who have coached in the NCAA (as of February, 2026).

- Hillary Smith (Head Coach, Dartmouth College): Smith was hired as the Head Coach at Dartmouth in July, 2026, after she had been the head coach for the Quinnipiac Bobcats for eight years. She previously was an Assistant Coach at Florida International University and at UCF, where she became the only player in program history to win a conference title as both a player and a coach.
- Cassady Brewer (Assistant Coach, Memphis Softball): A four-year starter for the Knights (2016–2019), Brewer has been an Assistant Coach with Memphis since August, 2024. She had returned to UCF as an assistant coach in July 2023 after spending three seasons at the University of Florida.
- Stephanie Best (Former Assistant Coach, UCF): One of the most decorated players in UCF history, Best served as an assistant coach for the Knights for several years starting in 2008. She now runs ProSwings, one of the nation's premiere softball camps for prospective collegiate softball players.
- Jennifer Whitley (Former Assistant Coach, UCF; Former Assistant Coach, Tallahassee Community College): After playing third base and catcher for UCF (2003–2005), Whitley served as a student assistant and later had two different stints as an assistant coach for the program. Whitley spent several seasons as an assistant coach for Tallahassee Community College, working primarily with catchers and infielders. She helped lead the Eagles to the 2008 and 2011 NJCAA National Tournaments. The TCC staff was named the NFCA NJCAA Division I South Region Coaching Staff of the Year in 2011.
- Shelby Turnier (Former Assistant Coach, University of North Florida Softball): After her time as one of the best pitchers in UCF softball history, Turnier was an Assistant Coach with the UNF Ospreys. She now works in private softball instruction with Delta Performance Softball.
- Alea White (Assistant Coach, University of North Georgia Softball): White holds the record for wins as a pitcher at UCF, and has been the Assistant Coach with the UNG Nighthawks since 2022.
- Shannon Doherty (Coaching Staff, Florida Atlantic University softball): Doherty was a standout player at UCF from 2020 to 2024, and is now the Director of Player Development with FAU Softball after a year on the coaching staff at UCF.

== Seasons ==
Record table
Season	Coach	Overall	Conference	Standing	Postseason
UCF Knights (Atlantic Sun) (2002–2005)
2002	Renee Luers-Gillispie	46–19	12–6	3rd	
2003	Renee Luers-Gillispie	37–31	13–7	4th	
2004	Renee Luers-Gillispie	42–21	16–4	2nd	
2005	Renee Luers-Gillispie	47–29–1	13–7	4th	NCAA Regionals
UCF Knights (Conference USA) (2006–2013)
2006	Renee Luers-Gillispie	19–37	4–20	9th	
2007	Renee Luers-Gillispie	38–26	11–13	4th	
2008	Renee Luers-Gillispie	49–20	16–7	2nd	NCAA Regional Final
2009	Renee Luers-Gillispie	27–27	11–12	5th	
2010	Renee Luers-Gillispie	36–23	16–7	3rd	NCAA Regionals
2011	Renee Luers-Gillispie	22–32	11–13	6th	
2012	Renee Luers-Gillispie	39–19	15–9	3rd	NCAA Regionals
2013	Renee Luers-Gillispie	29–25	10–14	3rd	
UCF Knights (American Athletic Conference) (2014–2023)
2014	Renee Luers-Gillispie	43–18	15–3	1st	NCAA Regional Final
2015	Renee Luers-Gillispie	50-9	16–2	1st	NCAA Regional Final
2016	Renee Luers-Gillispie	38–22	12–4	2nd	NCAA Regionals
2017	Renee Luers-Gillispie	29–23	11–7	3rd	
2018	Renee Luers-Gillispie	34–22	12–9	3rd	
2019	Cindy Ball-Malone	34–21	11–10	5th	
2020	Cindy Ball-Malone	21–5–1	0–0	1st	(season cancelled due to Covid)
2021	Cindy Ball-Malone	41–19–1	16–7–1	3rd	NCAA Regional Final
2022	Cindy Ball-Malone	49–14	16–2	1st	NCAA Super Regional
2023	Cindy Ball-Malone	40–21	15–3	2nd	NCAA Regionals
UCF Knights (Big 12 Conference) (2024–present)
2024	Cindy Ball-Malone	31–25	12–15	5th	NCAA Regionals
2025	Cindy Ball-Malone	35–24–1	12–12	7th	NCAA Regional Final
2026	Cindy Ball-Malone	41–19–1	14–9–1	4th	NCAA Super Regional
Total:		916–551–5	262–177–2		
National champion Postseason invitational champion Conference regular season champion Conference regular season and conference tournament champion Division regular season champion Division regular season and conference tournament champion Conference tournament champion

== All time record vs. conference opponents ==
Big 12 Conference
Opponent	Wins-Losses-Ties
Arizona	3–3
Arizona State	6–5
Baylor	4–14
BYU	5–1
Houston	39–24
Iowa State	8–6
Kansas	9–5
Oklahoma State	3–8
Texas Tech	4–6
Utah	4–0–1

- Note: Wins and losses include games played before UCF joined the Big 12 Conference for the 2024 Season, either as non-conference opponents or as conference opponents during previous league memberships.

Former Big 12 Conference Members
Opponent	Wins-Losses-Ties
Oklahoma	0-6
Texas	1-4

- Note: Wins and losses include games played before UCF joined the Big 12 Conference for the 2024 Season, and after the two former members left the Big 12 Conference at the conclusion of the 2024 season.

Previous Conferences
Opponent	Wins–Losses–Ties	Conference
Campbell	6–1	Atlantic Sun Conference
East Carolina	34–20	Conference-USA, American Athletic Conference
ETSU	1–0	Atlantic Sun Conference
Florida Atlantic	18–15	Atlantic Sun Conference
Gardner-Webb	3–0	Atlantic Sun Conference
Georgia State	8–3	Atlantic Sun Conference
Jacksonville	15–2	Atlantic Sun Conference
Kennesaw State	6–2	Atlantic Sun Conference
Lipscomb	4–2	Atlantic Sun Conference
Louisville	3–5	American Athletic Conference
Marshall	11–8	Conference-USA
Memphis	38–16	Conference-USA, American Athletic Conference
Mercer	10–3	Atlantic Sun Conference
North Florida	15–5	Atlantic Sun Conference
Rutgers	3–0	American Athletic Conference
South Florida	24–19	American Athletic Conference
Southern Miss	17–5	Conference-USA
Stetson	23–9	Atlantic Sun Conference
Troy	1–0	Atlantic Sun Conference
Tulsa	24–24	Conference-USA, American Athletic Conference
UAB	10–15	Conference-USA
UCONN	18–4	American Athletic Conference
UTEP	19–5	Conference-USA
Wichita State	4–13–1	American Athletic Conference

- Note: Wins and losses include games played as members of the same conference and non-conference matchups played before or after UCF shared conference affiliation with each program. UCF and Houston were both members of Conference-USA and the American Athletic Conference before joining the Big 12 Conference, and their win-loss totals are listed on the Big-12 Conference opponents chart.

== See also ==
- UCF Knights baseball
- List of University of Central Florida alumni
- List of University of Central Florida faculty and administrators
- List of NCAA Division I softball programs
