= List of Michigan Wolverines softball seasons =

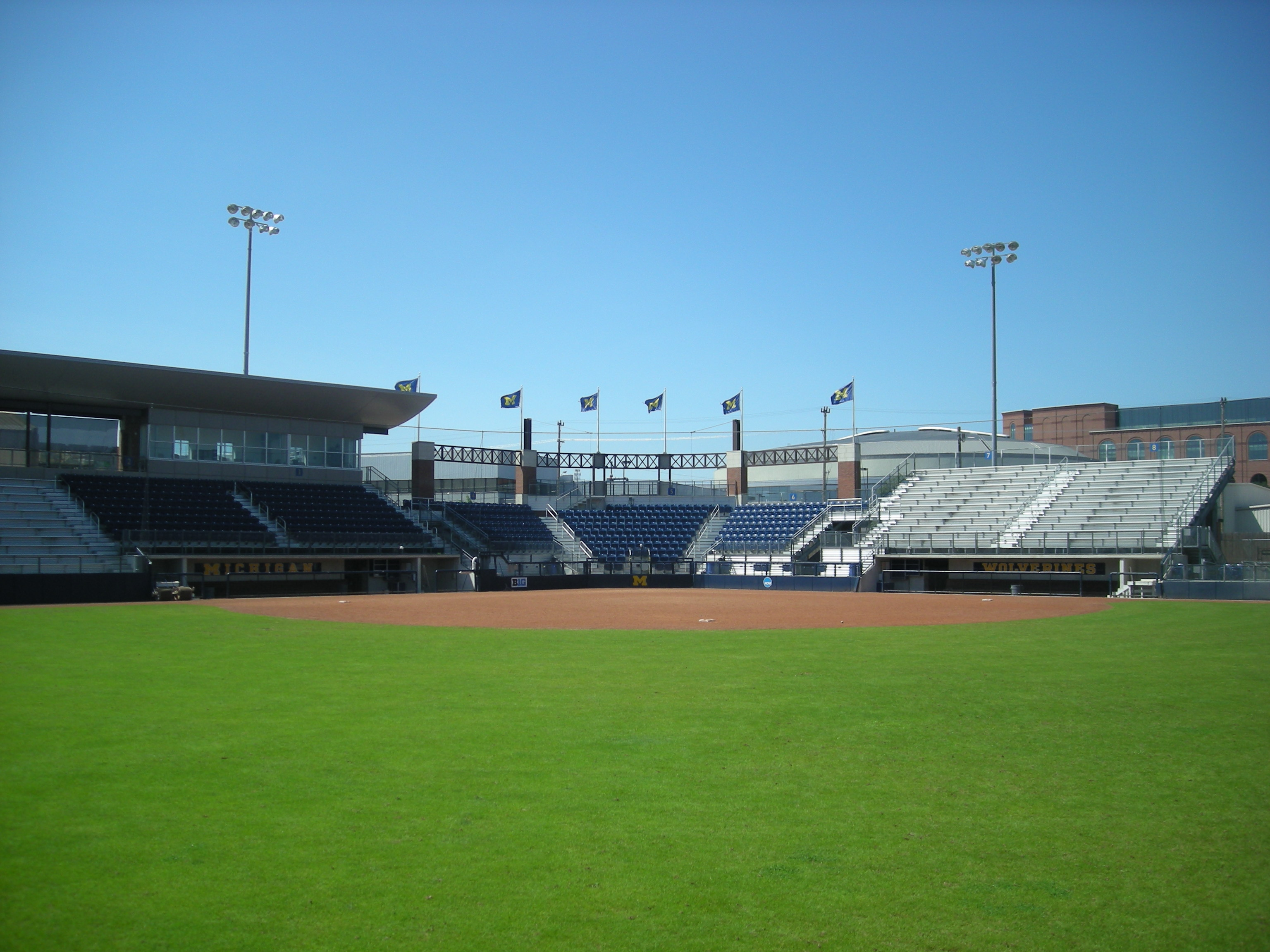
Alumni Field at The Wilpon Complex

This is a list of Michigan Wolverines softball seasons. The Michigan Wolverines softball program is a college softball team that represents the University of Michigan in the Big Ten Conference of the National Collegiate Athletic Association. Michigan has played their home games at Alumni Field in Ann Arbor, Michigan since 1982.

The Wolverines have won 22 conference regular season championships, 12 conference tournaments, and have appeared in the NCAA Division I softball tournament 32 times, advancing to the Women's College World Series on 13 occasions, and have won the national championship once.

== Season results ==
National champions	Women's College World Series berth	NCAA Tournament berth	Conference Tournament Champions	Conference Regular Season Champions

Season	Head coach	Conference	Season results									Tournament results	
Season	Head coach	Conference	Overall				Conference					Conference	Postseason
Season	Head coach	Conference	Wins	Losses	Ties	%	Wins	Losses	Ties	%	Finish	Conference	Postseason
Michigan Wolverines
1978	Gloria Soluk	Independent	12	6	0	.667	—	—	—	—	—	—	—
1979	Gloria Soluk	Independent	21	8	0	.724	—	—	—	—	—	—	—
1980	Gloria Soluk	Independent	16	11	0	.593	—	—	—	—	—	—	—
1981	Bob De Carolis	Independent	19	16	0	.543	—	—	—	—	—	—	—
1982	Bob De Carolis	Big Ten Conference	31	14	0	.689	4	0	0	1.000	—	—	WCWS 3rd
1983	Bob De Carolis	Big Ten Conference	32	27	0	.542	9	15	0	.375	6th	—	—
1984	Bob De Carolis	Big Ten Conference	32	24	0	.571	12	12	0	.500	4th	—	—
1985	Carol Hutchins	Big Ten Conference	28	20	0	.583	16	8	0	.667	2nd	—	—
1986	Carol Hutchins	Big Ten Conference	32	17	0	.653	12	12	0	.500	5th	—	—
1987	Carol Hutchins	Big Ten Conference	39	17	0	.696	17	7	0	.708	2nd	—	—
1988	Carol Hutchins	Big Ten Conference	29	20	0	.592	15	9	0	.625	2nd	—	—
1989	Carol Hutchins	Big Ten Conference	42	20	0	.677	16	8	0	.667	2nd	—	—
1990	Carol Hutchins	Big Ten Conference	29	27	0	.518	12	12	0	.500	4th	—	—
1991	Carol Hutchins	Big Ten Conference	36	19	0	.655	15	9	0	.625	3rd	—	—
1992	Carol Hutchins	Big Ten Conference	37	24	0	.607	22	6	0	.786	1st	2nd	—
1993	Carol Hutchins	Big Ten Conference	46	13	0	.780	21	5	0	.808	1st	2nd	—
1994	Carol Hutchins	Big Ten Conference	34	26	0	.567	18	10	0	.643	T-3rd	—	—
1995	Carol Hutchins	Big Ten Conference	50	12	0	.806	22	6	0	.786	1st	Champions	WCWS 7th
1996	Carol Hutchins	Big Ten Conference	51	14	0	.785	20	4	0	.833	1st	Champions	WCWS 7th
1997	Carol Hutchins	Big Ten Conference	56	16	1	.774	20	4	0	.833	1st	Champions	WCWS 5th
1998	Carol Hutchins	Big Ten Conference	56	7	0	.889	22	1	0	.957	1st	Champions	WCWS 5th
1999	Carol Hutchins	Big Ten Conference	51	13	1	.792	21	3	0	.875	1st	2nd	Regional No. 6
2000	Carol Hutchins	Big Ten Conference	45	16	1	.734	13	4	0	.765	2nd	Champions	Regional No. 8
2001	Carol Hutchins	Big Ten Conference	43	17	1	.713	17	3	0	.850	1st	2nd	WCWS T-7th
2002	Carol Hutchins	Big Ten Conference	50	11	0	.820	15	3	0	.833	1st	Champions	WCWS T-7th
2003	Carol Hutchins	Big Ten Conference	44	16	0	.733	13	5	0	.722	2nd	4th	Regional No. 7
2004	Carol Hutchins	Big Ten Conference	54	13	0	.806	17	3	0	.850	1st	T-5th	WCWS 7th
2005	Carol Hutchins	Big Ten Conference	54	13	0	.806	17	3	0	.850	1st	Champions	National Champions
2006	Carol Hutchins	Big Ten Conference	44	15	0	.746	14	4	0	.778	2nd	Champions	Knoxville Super Regional
2007	Carol Hutchins	Big Ten Conference	47	13	0	.783	12	4	0	.750	3rd	T-3rd	Waco Super Regional
2008	Carol Hutchins	Big Ten Conference	52	8	0	.867	18	2	0	.900	T-1st	T-5th	Ann Arbor Regional
2009	Carol Hutchins	Big Ten Conference	47	12	0	.797	17	3	0	.850	1st	—	WCWS 5th
2010	Carol Hutchins	Big Ten Conference	49	8	0	.860	18	1	0	.947	1st	—	Ann Arbor Super Regional
2011	Carol Hutchins	Big Ten Conference	53	6	0	.898	18	2	0	.900	1st	—	Ann Arbor Regional
2012	Carol Hutchins	Big Ten Conference	42	17	0	.712	18	5	0	.783	1st	—	Tuscaloosa Super Regional
2013	Carol Hutchins	Big Ten Conference	51	13	0	.797	20	2	0	.909	1st	T-3rd	WCWS T-5th
2014	Carol Hutchins	Big Ten Conference	47	15	0	.758	18	5	0	.783	T-1st	2nd	Tallahassee Super Regional
2015	Carol Hutchins	Big Ten Conference	60	8	0	.882	21	2	0	.913	1st	Champions	WCWS Runner-up
2016	Carol Hutchins	Big Ten Conference	52	7	0	.881	21	2	0	.913	1st	2nd	WCWS T-5th
2017	Carol Hutchins	Big Ten Conference	43	13	1	.763	20	3	0	.870	2nd	T-5th	Seattle Regional
2018	Carol Hutchins	Big Ten Conference	44	13	0	.772	18	3	0	.857	1st	T-5th	Eugene Regional
2019	Carol Hutchins	Big Ten Conference	43	11	0	.796	22	1	0	.957	1st	Champions	Ann Arbor Regional
2020	Carol Hutchins	Big Ten Conference	15	8	0	.652	0	0	0	–	2nd	Cancelled	Cancelled (Note: All remaining winter and spring championships cancelled due to the coronavirus pandemic.)
2021	Carol Hutchins	Big Ten Conference	38	8	0	.826	36	6	0	.857	1st	—	Seattle Regional
2022	Carol Hutchins	Big Ten Conference	38	18	0	.679	14	8	0	.636	4th	2nd	Orlando Regional
2023	Bonnie Tholl	Big Ten Conference	26	25	0	.510	10	13	0	.435	T-9th	T-9th	—
2024	Bonnie Tholl	Big Ten Conference	43	18	0	.705	18	5	0	.783	2nd	Champions	Stillwater Regional
2024	Bonnie Tholl	Big Ten Conference	39	21	0	.650	11	11	0	.500	T-8th	Champions	Austin Regional
2026	Bonnie Tholl	Big Ten Conference	36	22	0	.621	11	13	0	.458	T-9th	T-5th	Norman Regional
