= 2022 Michigan Wolverines softball team =

American college softball season

2022 Michigan Wolverines softball
- Conference: Big Ten Conference
- Record: 38–18 (14–8 Big Ten)
- Head coach: Carol Hutchins (38th season)
- Assistant coaches: Bonnie Tholl (29th season); Jennifer Brundage (24th season)
- Home stadium: Alumni Field

2022 Big Ten Conference softball standings
	Conf.						Overall
Team	W		L		T	PCT	W		L		T	PCT
No. 10 Northwestern ‍†‍‍^{y}	19	–	4	–	0	.826	45	–	13	–	0	.776
Nebraska ‍‍‡‍^{y}	17	–	5	–	0	.773	41	–	16	–	0	.719
Illinois ‍‍‍^{y}	15	–	7	–	0	.682	34	–	22	–	0	.607
Maryland ‍‍‍	14	–	8	–	0	.636	29	–	23	–	0	.558
No. 24 Michigan ‍‍‍^{y}	14	–	8	–	0	.636	38	–	18	–	0	.679
Ohio State ‍‍‍^{y}	13	–	9	–	0	.591	36	–	17	–	0	.679
Penn State ‍‍‍	13	–	10	–	0	.565	32	–	22	–	0	.593
Wisconsin ‍‍‍^{y}	12	–	11	–	0	.522	30	–	21	–	0	.588
Minnesota ‍‍‍^{y}	11	–	12	–	0	.478	27	–	26	–	1	.509
Indiana ‍‍‍	10	–	13	–	0	.435	27	–	22	–	0	.551
Purdue ‍‍‍	7	–	15	–	0	.318	24	–	31	–	0	.436
Michigan State ‍‍‍	4	–	16	–	0	.200	24	–	28	–	0	.462
Rutgers ‍‍‍	3	–	17	–	0	.150	25	–	30	–	0	.455
Iowa ‍‍‍	3	–	20	–	0	.130	21	–	31	–	0	.404
† – Conference champion ‡ – Tournament champion y – Invited to the NCAA tournament As of June 5, 2022; Rankings from NFCA/USA Today

The 2022 Michigan Wolverines softball team was an American college softball team that represented the University of Michigan during the 2022 NCAA Division I softball season. The Wolverines, were led by head coach Carol Hutchins in her thirty-eighth season, and played their home games at Alumni Field in Ann Arbor, Michigan.

== Previous season ==
The Wolverines finished the 2021 season 38–8 overall, and 36–6 in the Big Ten, finishing in first place in their conference. Following the conclusion of the regular season, the Wolverines received an automatic bid to the 2021 NCAA Division I softball tournament after winning the Big Ten Conference regular season championship and were defeated in the Regional Final by Washington.

== Roster ==
2022 Michigan Wolverines softball team
Players
Coaches

#	Pos.	Name	Bats/throws	Height	Year	High school/junior college	Home town
1	OF	Ellie Sieler	L/L	5 ft 5 in (1.65 m)	Fr	Monroe	Monroe, MI
2	INF	Keke Tholl	R/R	5 ft 10 in (1.78 m)	So	Victor J. Andrew	Tinley Park, IL
3	OF	Lexie Blair	L/L	5 ft 4 in (1.63 m)	Sr	West Orange	Winter Garden, FL
5	INF	Kaylee Rodriguez	R/R	5 ft 5 in (1.65 m)	So	Doral Academy	Miami, FL
7	INF	Ryleigh Carricaburu	R/R	5 ft 9 in (1.75 m)	So	Woodcrest Christian	Riverside, CA
8	RHP	Alex Storako	L/R	5 ft 11 in (1.8 m)	Sr	Lincoln-Way East	Frankfort, IL
10	LHP	Meghan Beaubien	L/L	5 ft 8 in (1.73 m)	GS	Saint Mary Catholic Central	Newport, MI
11	OF	Lexi Voss	R/R	5 ft 8 in (1.73 m)	Jr	Marist	Palos Park, IL
12	LHP	Lauren Esman	L/L	5 ft 10 in (1.78 m)	Jr	Gull Lake	Kalamazoo, MI
13	INF	Taylor Bump	R/R	5 ft 10 in (1.78 m)	GS	Canterbury School of Florida	St. Petersburg, FL
16	C	Jessica Garmen	R/R	5 ft 9 in (1.75 m)	Jr	Detroit Country Day	Waterford, MI
17	INF	Sierra Kersten	L/R	5 ft 8 in (1.73 m)	So	Clarkston	Clarkston, MI
18	RHP	Lauren Derkowski	R/R	5 ft 8 in (1.73 m)	Fr	York Community	Elmhurst, IL
20	INF	Hannah Carson	L/R	5 ft 6 in (1.68 m)	Sr	Mount Pleasant	Weidman, MI
22	RHP	Emerson Aiken	R/R	5 ft 8 in (1.73 m)	Fr	Glen Allen	Henrico, VA
23	OF	Kristina Burkhardt	L/L	5 ft 8 in (1.73 m)	GS	Bishop Dwenger	Fort Wayne, IN
25	U	Audrey Leclair	L/R	5 ft 8 in (1.73 m)	Jr	Phoenix Country Day	Phoenix, AZ
32	INF	Ella McVey	L/R	5 ft 7 in (1.7 m)	Fr	Dowling Catholic	Des Moines, IA
66	U	Annabelle Widra	L/R	5 ft 7 in (1.7 m)	Fr	Spain Park	Hoover, AL

Head coach

Carol Hutchins (Michigan State)

Assistant coach(es)

Bonnie Tholl (Michigan)
Jennifer Brundage (UCLA)

Legend

- (C) Team captain
- (S) Suspended
- (I) Ineligible
- Injured
- Current redshirt

Roster

== Schedule and results ==
2022 Michigan Wolverines softball game log
Regular season (34–15)

February (9–5)
Date	Opponent	Rank	Stadium Site	Score	Win	Loss	Save	Attendance	Overall record	B1G record
February 11	vs. Kansas City; USF Tournament	No. 16	USF Softball Stadium; Tampa, FL	6–0	**Beaubien** (1–0)	Hoveland (0–1)	—	—	1–0	—
February 11	vs. Illinois State; USF Tournament	No. 16	USF Softball Stadium; Tampa, FL	4–1	**Storako** (1–0)	Fox (0–2)	—	—	2–0	—
February 12	vs. No. 6 Florida; USF Tournament	No. 16	USF Softball Stadium; Tampa, FL	0–4	Delbrey (1–0)	**Beaubien** (1–1)	—	—	2–1	—
February 12	at South Florida; USF Tournament	No. 16	USF Softball Stadium; Tampa, FL	1–4	Corrick (2–0)	**Derkowski** (0–1)	—	—	2–2	—
February 13	vs. Kansas City; USF Tournament	No. 16	USF Softball Stadium; Tampa, FL	2–0	**Storako** (2–0)	Stout (0–1)	—	—	3–2	—
February 18	vs. No. 7 Oklahoma State; St. Pete/Clearwater Elite Invitational	No. 19	Eddie C. Moore Complex; Clearwater, FL	0–4	Maxwell (3–0)	**Beaubien** (1–2)	—	785	3–3	—
February 18	vs. No. 24 UCF; St. Pete/Clearwater Elite Invitational	No. 19	Eddie C. Moore Complex; Clearwater, FL	6–0	**Storako** (3–0)	Felton (1–1)	—	785	4–3	—
February 19	vs. No. 5 Florida State; St. Pete/Clearwater Elite Invitational	No. 19	Eddie C. Moore Complex; Clearwater, FL	1–2	Watson (4–0)	**Derkowski** (0–2)	Sandercock (1)	—	4–4	—
February 19	vs. No. 21 LSU; St. Pete/Clearwater Elite Invitational	No. 19	Eddie C. Moore Complex; Clearwater, FL	6–1	**Storako** (4–0)	Wickersham (0–3)	—	—	5–4	—
February 24	vs. Army; Duke Invitational	No. 19	Duke Softball Stadium; Durham, NC	Cancelled						
February 25	vs. Northern Kentucky; Duke Invitational	No. 19	Duke Softball Stadium; Durham, NC	3–0	**Storako** (5–0)	Flores (2–2)	—	—	6–4	—
February 25	vs. No. 13 Duke; Duke Invitational	No. 19	Duke Softball Stadium; Durham, NC	3–2	**Storako** (6–0)	St. George (2–1)	**Beaubien** (1)	—	7–4	—
February 26	vs. No. 13 Duke; Duke Invitational	No. 19	Duke Softball Stadium; Durham, NC	1–6	St. George (3–1)	**Beaubien** (1–3)	—	610	7–5	—
February 26	vs. Northern Kentucky; Duke Invitational	No. 19	Duke Softball Stadium; Durham, NC	14–1	**Storako** (7–0)	Hicks (2–2)	—	610	8–5	—
February 28	at Elon	No. 19	Hunt Softball Park; Elon, NC	11–3 ^{(5)}	**Storako** (8–0)	Cherry (2–2)	—	111	9–5	—

March (10–4)
Date	Opponent	Rank	Stadium Site	Score	Win	Loss	Save	Attendance	Overall record	B1G record
March 1	at North Carolina	No. 19	Williams Field at Anderson Stadium; Chapel Hill, NC	8–0 ^{(5)}	**Beaubien** (2–3)	Backes (2–4)	—	411	10–5	—
March 3	at No. 10 Kentucky; Kentucky Tournament	No. 19	John Cropp Stadium; Lexington, KY	8–0	**Storako** (9–0)	Schoonover (3–1)	—	938	11–5	—
March 4	vs. Kent State; Kentucky Tournament	No. 19	John Cropp Stadium; Lexington, KY	13–0 ^{(5)}	**Widra** (1–0)	Ringler (2–1)	—	123	12–5	—
March 4	at No. 10 Kentucky; Kentucky Tournament	No. 19	John Cropp Stadium; Lexington, KY	2–9	Stoddard (3–1)	**Beaubien** (2–4)	—	1,592	12–6	—
March 5	vs. Drake; Kentucky Tournament	No. 19	John Cropp Stadium; Lexington, KY	1–0 ^{(8)}	**Storako** (10–0)	Timmons (2–4)	—	231	13–6	—
March 10	Kent State	No. 19	Alumni Field; Ann Arbor, MI	11–1 ^{(5)}	**Storako** (11–0)	LeBeau (3–4)	—	—	14–6	—
March 10	Kent State	No. 19	Alumni Field; Ann Arbor, MI	4–3	**Storako** (12–0)	Scali (0–4)	—	1,018	15–6	—
March 13	Kent State	No. 19	Alumni Field; Ann Arbor, MI	Cancelled						
March 15	Toledo	No. 21	Alumni Field; Ann Arbor, MI	8–0 ^{(5)}	**Beaubien** (3–4)	Knight (3–4)	—	383	16–6	—
March 16	Oakland	No. 21	Alumni Field; Ann Arbor, MI	6–0	**Storako** (13–0)	Campbell (7–4)	—	963	17–6	—
March 22	Western Michigan	No. 19	Alumni Field; Ann Arbor, MI	9–1 ^{(6)}	**Beaubien** (4–4)	Bajusz (4–6)	—	817	18–6	—
March 23	Miami (OH)	No. 19	Alumni Field; Ann Arbor, MI	3–7	Vierstra (3–6)	**Storako** (13–1)	—	861	18–7	—
March 25	Nebraska	No. 19	Alumni Field; Ann Arbor, MI	2–3	Ferrell (11–4)	**Storako** (13–2)	Wallace (2)	1,011	18–8	0–1
March 25	Nebraska	No. 19	Alumni Field; Ann Arbor, MI	4–7	Wallace (10–4)	**Derkowski** (0–3)	—	1,011	18–9	0–2
March 26	Nebraska	No. 19	Alumni Field; Ann Arbor, MI	Cancelled						
March 29	Bowling Green	No. 23	Alumni Field; Ann Arbor, MI	3–0	**Storako** (14–2)	Gottshall (9–6)	—	988	19–9	0–2

April (11–6)
Date	Opponent	Rank	Stadium Site	Score	Win	Loss	Save	Attendance	Overall record	B1G record
April 1	at No. 9 Northwestern	No. 23	Sharon J. Drysdale Field; Evanston, IL	3–4 ^{(9)}	Williams (14–1)	**Storako** (14–3)	—	521	19–10	0–3
April 2	at No. 9 Northwestern	No. 23	Sharon J. Drysdale Field; Evanston, IL	Suspended (inclement weather). Continuation held on April 3.^{[a]}						
April 3	at No. 9 Northwestern	No. 23	Sharon J. Drysdale Field; Evanston, IL	4–6	Boyd (4–1)	**Storako** (14–4)	Williams (6)	815	19–11	0–4
April 3	at No. 9 Northwestern	No. 23	Sharon J. Drysdale Field; Evanston, IL	8–3	**Beaubien** (5–4)	Williams (14–2)	**Derkowski** (1)	1,000	20–11	1–4
April 6	Michigan State	No. 22	Alumni Field; Ann Arbor, MI	6–1	**Storako** (15–4)	Miller (10–9)	—	1,885	21–11	2–4
April 8	Penn State	No. 22	Alumni Field; Ann Arbor, MI	8–0 ^{(5)}	**Storako** (16–4)	Parshall (13–5)	—	1,057	22–11	3–4
April 9	Penn State	No. 22	Alumni Field; Ann Arbor, MI	2–1	**Storako** (17–4)	Parshall (13–6)	—	1,605	23–11	4–4
April 10	Penn State	No. 22	Alumni Field; Ann Arbor, MI	2–3	Parshall (14–6)	**Storako** (17–5)	—	2,063	23–12	4–5
April 12	Central Michigan	No. 22	Alumni Field; Ann Arbor, MI	5–1	**Derkowski** (1–3)	Bean (4–8)	**Widra** (1)	1,081	24–12	—
April 14	at Maryland	No. 22	Maryland Softball Stadium; College Park, MD	1–5	Schlotterbeck (10–10)	**Storako** (17–6)	—	532	24–13	4–6
April 15	at Maryland	No. 22	Maryland Softball Stadium; College Park, MD	5–3 ^{(8)}	**Beaubien** (6–4)	Wyche (8–5)	—	693	25–13	5–6
April 16	at Maryland	No. 22	Maryland Softball Stadium; College Park, MD	9–2	**Beaubien** (7–4)	Ellefson (3–2)	—	614	26–13	6–6
April 19	at Michigan State	No. 23	Secchia Stadium; East Lansing, MI	3–2	**Storako** (18–6)	Miller (11–14)	—	1,040	27–13	7–6
April 22	Ohio State	No. 23	Alumni Field; Ann Arbor, MI	2–6	Handley (16–6)	**Storako** (18–7)	—	1,617	27–14	7–7
April 23	Ohio State	No. 23	Alumni Field; Ann Arbor, MI	4–3	**Beaubien** (8–4)	Smith (7–3)	—	2,366	28–14	8–7
April 24	Ohio State	No. 23	Alumni Field; Ann Arbor, MI	5–4	**Storako** (19–7)	Smith (7–4)	—	2,372	29–14	9–7
April 29	Minnesota	No. 23	Alumni Field; Ann Arbor, MI	2–3	Leavitt (11–9)	**Beaubien** (8–5)	Pease (4)	1,730	29–15	9–8
April 30	Minnesota	No. 23	Alumni Field; Ann Arbor, MI	1–0	**Storako** (20–7)	Pease (10–11)	—	1,921	30–15	10–8

May (4–0)
Date	Opponent	Rank	Stadium Site	Score	Win	Loss	Save	Attendance	Overall record	B1G record
May 1	Minnesota	No. 23	Alumni Field; Ann Arbor, MI	8–4	**Storako** (21–7)	Pease (10–12)	**Beaubien** (2)	2,383	31–15	11–8
May 6	at Wisconsin	No. 23	Goodman Softball Complex; Madison, WI	10–2	**Derkowski** (2–3)	Schwartz (22–8)	**Widra** (2)	542	32–15	12–8
May 7	at Wisconsin	No. 23	Goodman Softball Complex; Madison, WI	6–1	**Storako** (22–7)	Schwartz (22–9)	—	1,273	33–15	13–8
May 8	at Wisconsin	No. 23	Goodman Softball Complex; Madison, WI	13–9	**Derkowski** (3–3)	Schwartz (22–10)	—	814	34–15	14–8

Postseason (4–3)

Big Ten Tournament (2–1)
Date	Opponent	Rank	Site/stadium	Score	Win	Loss	Save	Attendance	Overall record	B1GT record
May 12	Maryland	No. 23	Secchia Stadium	7–0	**Storako** (23–7)	Schlotterbeck (12–13)	—	2,014	35–15	1–0
May 13	No. 11 Northwestern	No. 23	Secchia Stadium	2–1	**Widra** (2–0)	Williams (26–4)	—	—	36–15	2–0
May 14	Nebraska	No. 23	Secchia Stadium	1–3 ^{(8)}	Wallace (17–6)	**Storako** (23–8)	—	—	36–16	2–1

Orlando Regional (2–2)
Date	Opponent	Rank	Site/stadium	Score	Win	Loss	Save	Attendance	Overall record	Regional record
May 20	South Dakota State	No. 24	UCF Softball Complex; Orlando, FL	2–1	**Storako** (24–8)	Glanzer (20–6)	**Beaubien** (3)	—	37–16	1–0
May 21	No. 18 UCF	No. 24	UCF Softball Complex	2–3 ^{(11)}	Woodall (18–4)	**Beaubien** (8–6)	—	—	37–17	1–1
May 22	South Dakota State	No. 24	UCF Softball Complex	4–1	**Storako** (25–8)	Glanzer (20–7)	—	—	38–17	2–1
May 22	No. 18 UCF	No. 24	UCF Softball Complex	4–9	Mancha (23–3)	**Beaubien** (8–7)	—	—	38–18	2–1

- Win
- Loss
- Postponement
- Bold: Wolverines team member
- Rankings from NFCA.
- (#) Tournament seedings in parentheses.

Notes:

- **^{a}** The April 2 game at Northwestern was suspended due to snow in the top of the third inning with the game still scoreless. It was completed on April 3 prior to the regularly scheduled game that afternoon.

== Rankings ==
Ranking movements Legend: ██ Increase in ranking ██ Decrease in ranking — = Not ranked RV = Received votes
	Week															
Poll	Pre	1	2	3	4	5	6	7	8	9	10	11	12	13	14	Final
NFCA / USA Today	16	19	19	19	19	21	19	23	22	22	23	23	23	23	24	RV
Softball America	13	18	17	17	16	18	17	23	23	23	24	22	24	21	21	23
ESPN.com/USA Softball	13	16	16	19	17	19	16	22	21	22	22	22	22	23	22	24
D1Softball	12	17	17	16	15	15	13	21	22	21	22	22	21	20	20	—
