= 2021 Michigan Wolverines softball team =

American college softball season

2021 Michigan Wolverines softball

Big Ten Regular Season Champions NCAA Seattle Regional
- Conference: Big Ten Conference
- Record: 38–8 (36–6 Big Ten)
- Head coach: Carol Hutchins (37th season)
- Assistant coaches: Bonnie Tholl (28th season); Jennifer Brundage (23rd season)
- Home stadium: Alumni Field

2021 Big Ten Conference softball standings
	Conf.				Overall
Team	W		L	PCT	W		L	PCT
No. 18 Michigan ‍†‍‍^{y}	36	–	6	.857	38	–	8	.826
No. 23 Minnesota ‍‍‍^{y}	29	–	11	.725	31	–	13	.705
Northwestern ‍‍‍^{y}	29	–	15	.659	30	–	17	.638
Iowa ‍‍‍	26	–	18	.591	26	–	18	.591
Indiana ‍‍‍	25	–	19	.568	25	–	19	.568
Ohio State ‍‍‍	24	–	19	.558	24	–	19	.558
Illinois ‍‍‍	24	–	20	.545	24	–	20	.545
Nebraska ‍‍‍	22	–	22	.500	22	–	22	.500
Wisconsin ‍‍‍	18	–	22	.450	18	–	22	.450
Maryland ‍‍‍	19	–	25	.432	19	–	25	.432
Purdue ‍‍‍	18	–	26	.409	18	–	26	.409
Michigan State ‍‍‍	14	–	26	.350	14	–	26	.350
Rutgers ‍‍‍	8	–	36	.182	8	–	36	.182
Penn State ‍‍‍	7	–	34	.171	7	–	34	.171
† – Conference champion y – Invited to the NCAA tournament As of May 23, 2021; Rankings from NFCA/USA Today

The 2021 Michigan Wolverines softball team was an American college softball team that represented the University of Michigan during the 2021 NCAA Division I softball season. The Wolverines were led by head coach Carol Hutchins in her thirty-seventh season, and played their home games at Alumni Field in Ann Arbor, Michigan.

== Previous season ==
The Wolverines finished the 2020 season 15–8 overall, in a season shortened due to the COVID-19 pandemic.

== Preseason ==
Michigan was ranked No. 17 by NFCA/USA Today and ESPN.com/USA Softball, No. 18 by D1Softball, and No. 20 by Softball America in the preseason polls, the only Big Ten Conference team named in each poll.

== Roster ==
2021 Michigan Wolverines softball team
Players
Coaches

#	Pos.	Name	Bats/throws	Height	Year	High school/junior college	Home town
1	OF	Thais Gonzalez	L/R	5 ft 4 in (1.63 m)	Sr	St. Thomas Aquinas	Boca Raton, FL
2	INF	Keke Tholl	R/R	5 ft 10 in (1.78 m)	Fr	Victor J. Andrew	Tinley Park, IL
3	OF	Lexie Blair	L/L	5 ft 4 in (1.63 m)	Jr	West Orange	Winter Garden, FL
4	RHP	Chandler Dennis	R/R	5 ft 9 in (1.75 m)	So	North Gwinnett	Suwanee, GA
5	INF	Kaylee Rodriguez	R/R	5 ft 5 in (1.65 m)	Fr	Doral Academy	Miami, FL
7	INF	Ryleigh Carricaburu	R/R	5 ft 9 in (1.75 m)	Fr	Woodcrest Christian	Riverside, CA
8	RHP	Alex Storako	L/R	5 ft 11 in (1.8 m)	Jr	Lincoln-Way East	Frankfort, IL
10	LHP	Meghan Beaubien	L/L	5 ft 8 in (1.73 m)	Sr	Saint Mary Catholic Central	Newport, MI
11	OF	Lexi Voss	R/R	5 ft 8 in (1.73 m)	So	Marist	Palos Park, IL
12	LHP	Lauren Esman	L/L	5 ft 10 in (1.78 m)	So	Gull Lake	Kalamazoo, MI
13	INF	Taylor Bump	R/R	5 ft 10 in (1.78 m)	Sr	Canterbury School of Florida	St. Petersburg, FL
14	INF	Lou Allan	R/R	5 ft 5 in (1.65 m)	Sr	Oak Hills	Hesperia, CA
16	C	Jessica Garmen	R/R	5 ft 9 in (1.75 m)	So	Detroit Country Day	Waterford, MI
17	INF	Sierra Kersten	L/R	5 ft 8 in (1.73 m)	Fr	Clarkston	Clarkston, MI
18	RHP	Sarah Schaefer	R/R	5 ft 9 in (1.75 m)	Sr	Waukee	West Des Moines, IA
20	INF	Hannah Carson	L/R	5 ft 6 in (1.68 m)	Jr	Mount Pleasant	Weidman, MI
21	INF	Natalia Rodriguez	S/R	5 ft 4 in (1.63 m)	Sr	Montverde Academy	Clermont, FL
22	INF	Julia Jimenez	R/R	5 ft 3 in (1.6 m)	Fr	Etiwanda	Fontana, CA
25	U	Audrey Leclair	L/R	5 ft 8 in (1.73 m)	So	Phoenix Country Day	Phoenix, AZ
32	OF	Haley Hoogenraad	R/R	5 ft 9 in (1.75 m)	Sr	Zeeland West	Zeeland, MI

Head coach

Carol Hutchins (Michigan State)

Assistant coach(es)

Bonnie Tholl (Michigan)
Jennifer Brundage (UCLA)

Legend

- (C) Team captain
- (S) Suspended
- (I) Ineligible
- Injured
- Current redshirt

Roster

== Schedule and results ==
2021 Michigan Wolverines Softball Game Log
Regular season (36–6)
February (4–2)

Date	Opponent	Rank	Stadium Site	Score	Win	Loss	Save	Attendance	Overall record	B1G record
February 26	vs. Purdue	No. 17	Sleepy Hollow Sports Complex; Leesburg, FL	4–0	**Beaubien** (1–0)	Bates (0–1)	—	100	1–0	1–0
February 26	vs. Purdue	No. 17	Sleepy Hollow Sports Complex	4–0	**Storako** (1–0)	Henley (0–1)	—	100	2–0	2–0
February 27	vs. Iowa	No. 17	Sleepy Hollow Sports Complex	2–0	**Beaubien** (2–0)	Doocy (0–1)	—	0	3–0	3–0
February 27	vs. Iowa	No. 17	Sleepy Hollow Sports Complex	6–5	**Storako** (2–0)	Loecker (0–1)	—	0	4–0	4–0
February 28	vs. Illinois	No. 17	Sleepy Hollow Sports Complex	1–2	Sickels (2–1)	**Beaubien** (2–1)	—	0	4–1	4–1
February 28	vs. Illinois	No. 17	Sleepy Hollow Sports Complex	1–2	Jarvis (3–0)	**Storako** (2–1)	Sickels (1)	0	4–2	4–2

March (9–1)

Date	Opponent	Rank	Stadium Site	Score	Win	Loss	Save	Attendance	Overall record	B1G record
March 11	vs. Nebraska	No. 23	Sleepy Hollow Sports Complex	2–1 ^{(8)}	**Beaubien** (3–1)	Ferrell (1–4)	—	86	5–2	5–2
March 11	vs. Nebraska	No. 23	Sleepy Hollow Sports Complex	2–0	**Storako** (3–1)	Wallace (2–1)	—	74	6–2	6–2
March 12	vs. Nebraska	No. 23	Sleepy Hollow Sports Complex	4–5 ^{(8)}	Wallace (3–1)	**Storako** (3–2)	—	74	6–3	6–3
March 13	vs. Wisconsin	No. 23	Sleepy Hollow Sports Complex	8–0 ^{(5)}	**Storako** (4–2)	Schwartz (2–3)	—	66	7–3	7–3
March 13	vs. Wisconsin	No. 23	Sleepy Hollow Sports Complex	3–0	**Storako** (5–2)	Schwartz (2–4)	—	66	8–3	8–3
March 14	vs. Wisconsin	No. 23	Sleepy Hollow Sports Complex	2–1	**Storako** (6–2)	Hestekin (2–1)	—	59	9–3	9–3
March 26	at Indiana	No. 25	Andy Mohr Field; Bloomington, IN	7–1	**Beaubien** (4–1)	Goodin (3–3)	—	98	10–3	10–3
March 27	at Indiana	No. 25	Andy Mohr Field	3–1 ^{(9)}	**Storako** (7–2)	Goodin (3–4)	—	103	11–3	11–3
March 27	at Indiana	No. 25	Andy Mohr Field	8–1	**Beaubien** (5–1)	Goodin (3–5)	—	103	12–3	12–3
March 28	at Indiana	No. 25	Andy Mohr Field	4–0	**Storako** (8–2)	Goodin (3–6)	—	56	13–3	13–3

April (12–2)

Date	Opponent	Rank	Stadium Site	Score	Win	Loss	Save	Attendance	Overall record	B1G record
April 2	Michigan State	No. 23	Alumni Field; Ann Arbor, MI	Postponed due to COVID-19 protocols						
April 3	Michigan State	No. 23	Alumni Field	Postponed due to COVID-19 protocols						
April 3	Michigan State	No. 23	Alumni Field	Postponed due to COVID-19 protocols						
April 4	Michigan State	No. 23	Alumni Field	Postponed due to COVID-19 protocols						
April 9	at Ohio State	No. 23	Buckeye Field; Columbus, OH	7–0	**Beaubien** (6–1)	Buresch (5–2)	—	150	14–3	14–3
April 10	at Ohio State	No. 23	Buckeye Field	3–1	**Storako** (9–2)	Smith (7–6)	—	177	15–3	15–3
April 10	at Ohio State	No. 23	Buckeye Field	2–3	Buresch (6–2)	**Beaubien** (6–2)	—	164	15–4	15–4
April 11	at Ohio State	No. 23	Buckeye Field	11–0	**Storako** (10–2)	Smith (7–7)	—	151	16–4	16–4
April 14	Michigan State	No. 22	Alumni Field	6–1	**Storako** (11–2)	Ladd (2–6)	—	93	17–4	17–4
April 16	Maryland	No. 22	Alumni Field	4–2	**Beaubien** (7–2)	Brann (3–5)	—	96	18–4	18–4
April 17	Maryland	No. 22	Alumni Field	2–0	**Storako** (12–2)	Wyche (2–4)	—	138	19–4	19–4
April 17	Maryland	No. 22	Alumni Field	5–1	**Beaubien** (8–2)	Ellefson (1–2)	—	138	20–4	20–4
April 18	Maryland	No. 22	Alumni Field	8–0 ^{(5)}	**Storako** (13–2)	Wyche (2–5)	—	123	21–4	21–4
April 23	Northwestern	No. 20	Alumni Field	1–4	Williams (13–2)	**Beaubien** (8–3)	—	192	21–5	21–5
April 24	Northwestern	No. 20	Alumni Field	7–2	**Storako** (14–2)	Boyd (3–2)	—	181	22–5	22–5
April 24	Northwestern	No. 20	Alumni Field	6–3	**Beaubien** (9–3)	Williams (13–3)	—	181	23–5	23–5
April 25	Northwestern	No. 20	Alumni Field	2–0	**Storako** (15–2)	Newport (4–3)	—	164	24–5	24–5
April 30	at Penn State	No. 19	Beard Field; State College, PA	7–1	**Beaubien** (10–3)	Parshall (1–13)	—	118	25–5	25–5

May (11–1)

Date	Opponent	Rank	Stadium Site	Score	Win	Loss	Save	Attendance	Overall record	B1G record
May 1	at Penn State	No. 19	Beard Field	10–0 ^{(6)}	**Storako** (16–2)	Lingenfelter (1–8)	—	166	26–5	26–5
May 1	at Penn State	No. 19	Beard Field	12–2 ^{(6)}	**Beaubien** (11–3)	Oatley (3–3)	—	166	27–5	27–5
May 2	at Penn State	No. 19	Beard Field	5–3	**Storako** (17–2)	Parshall (1–14)	**Beaubien** (3)	155	28–5	28–5
May 5	at Michigan State	No. 19	Secchia Stadium; East Lansing, MI	1–0 ^{(9)}	**Storako** (18–2)	Miller (6–7)	—	0	29–5	29–5
May 7	at No. 23 Minnesota	No. 19	Jane Sage Cowles Stadium; Minneapolis, MN	3–0	**Beaubien** (12–3)	Fiser (12–5)	**Storako** (1)	0	30–5	30–5
May 8	at No. 23 Minnesota	No. 19	Jane Sage Cowles Stadium	10–4	**Storako** (19–2)	Fiser (12–7)	—	0	31–5	31–5
May 8	at No. 23 Minnesota	No. 19	Jane Sage Cowles Stadium	3–1	**Beaubien** (13–3)	Pease (11–2)	—	0	32–5	32–5
May 9	at No. 23 Minnesota	No. 19	Jane Sage Cowles Stadium	3–7	Fiser (13–7)	**Storako** (19–3)	—	0	32–6	32–6
May 14	Rutgers	No. 18	Alumni Field	3–0	**Beaubien** (14–3)	Hitchcock (5–15)	—	207	33–6	33–6
May 15	Rutgers	No. 18	Alumni Field	13–0 ^{(5)}	**Storako** (20–3)	Vickers (0–4)	—	143	34–6	34–6
May 15	Rutgers	No. 18	Alumni Field	11–0 ^{(5)}	**Beaubien** (15–3)	Hitchcock (5–16)	—	143	35–6	35–6
May 16	Rutgers	No. 18	Alumni Field	2–1	**Storako** (21–3)	Hitchcock (5–17)	—	140	36–6	36–6

Postseason (2–2)
Seattle Regional (2–2)

Date	Opponent	Rank	Stadium Site	Score	Win	Loss	Save	Attendance	Overall record	Regional record
May 21	Seattle	No. 20	Husky Softball Stadium; Seattle, WA	2–0	**Beaubien** (16–3)	Nance (10–6)	—	250	37–6	1–0
May 22	No. 6 Washington (16)	No. 20	Husky Softball Stadium	2–1	**Storako** (22–3)	Plain (30–3)	—	250	38–6	2–0
May 23	No. 6 Washington (16)	No. 20	Husky Softball Stadium	0–2	Plain (31–3)	**Beaubien** (16–4)	—	200	38–7	2–1
May 23	No. 6 Washington (16)	No. 20	Husky Softball Stadium	5–10	Plain (32–3)	**Beaubien** (16–5)	—	200	38–8	2–2

- Win
- Loss
- Postponement
- Bold: Wolverines team member
- Rankings from NFCA.
- (#) Tournament seedings in parentheses.

== Rankings ==
Ranking movements Legend: ██ Increase in ranking ██ Decrease in ranking — = Not ranked RV = Received votes
	Week															
Poll	Pre	1	2	3	4	5	6	7	8	9	10	11	12	13	14	Final
NFCA / USA Today	17	17	17	21	23	25	25	23	23	22	20	19	19	18	20	19
Softball America	20	20	20	25	25	—	—	—	23	25	25	25	22	21	21	18
ESPN.com/USA Softball	17	17	17	22	25	RV	RV	RV	24	22	20	20	19	19	20	20
D1Softball	18	21	20	21	22	—	—	—	—	—	22	21	21	18	18	20

== Awards and honors ==
Weekly Awards
Player	Award	Date Awarded	Ref.
Meghan Beaubien	Co-Big Ten Pitcher of the Week	March 2, 2021	
Alex Storako	Big Ten Pitcher of the Week	March 30, 2021	
Alex Storako	Big Ten Pitcher of the Week	April 13, 2021	
Alex Storako	Co-Big Ten Pitcher of the Week	April 20, 2021	
Alex Storako	Big Ten Pitcher of the Week	April 27, 2021	
Meghan Beaubien	Co-Big Ten Pitcher of the Week	May 11, 2021	
Julia Jimenez	Co-Big Ten Player of the Week	May 11, 2021	
Meghan Beaubien	Big Ten Pitcher of the Week	May 18, 2021	

Individual Awards
Player	Award	Ref.
Lexie Blair	Big Ten Player of the Year	
Alex Storako	Big Ten Pitcher of the Year	
Carol Hutchins	Big Ten Coach of the Year	

All-Big Ten
Player	Selection	Ref.
Lou Allan	First Team	
Meghan Beaubien	First Team	
Lexie Blair	First Team	
Taylor Bump	First Team	
Alex Storako	First Team	
Julia Jimenez	Second Team	
Taylor Bump	All-Defensive	
Natalia Rodriguez	All-Defensive	

All-American
Player	Selection	Ref.
Alex Storako	Second Team	
