= 2020 Michigan Wolverines softball team =

American college softball season

2020 Michigan Wolverines softball
- Conference: Big Ten Conference
- Record: 15–8 (0–0 Big Ten)
- Head coach: Carol Hutchins (36th season)
- Assistant coaches: Bonnie Tholl (27th season); Jennifer Brundage (22nd season)
- Home stadium: Alumni Field

2020 Big Ten Conference softball standings
	Conf.						Overall
Team	W		L		T	PCT	W		L		T	PCT
Iowa ‍‍‍	0	–	0	–	0	–	17	–	5	–	0	.773
No. 18 Michigan ‍‍‍	0	–	0	–	0	–	15	–	8	–	0	.652
No. 19 Minnesota ‍‍‍	0	–	0	–	0	–	15	–	9	–	1	.620
Purdue ‍‍‍	0	–	0	–	0	–	15	–	10	–	0	.600
Wisconsin ‍‍‍	0	–	0	–	0	–	14	–	10	–	0	.583
Indiana ‍‍‍	0	–	0	–	0	–	12	–	9	–	0	.571
Maryland ‍‍‍	0	–	0	–	0	–	12	–	11	–	0	.522
Illinois ‍‍‍	0	–	0	–	0	–	11	–	11	–	0	.500
Ohio State ‍‍‍	0	–	0	–	0	–	9	–	9	–	0	.500
Northwestern ‍‍‍	0	–	0	–	0	–	11	–	12	–	0	.478
Penn State ‍‍‍	0	–	0	–	0	–	11	–	15	–	0	.423
Rutgers ‍‍‍	0	–	0	–	0	–	10	–	14	–	0	.417
Nebraska ‍‍‍	0	–	0	–	0	–	9	–	14	–	0	.391
Michigan State ‍‍‍	0	–	0	–	0	–	6	–	16	–	0	.273
† – Conference champion ‡ – Tournament champion y – Invited to the NCAA tournament As of March 13, 2020; Rankings from NFCA

The 2020 Michigan Wolverines softball team was an American college softball team that represented the University of Michigan during the 2020 NCAA Division I softball season. The Wolverines, led by head coach Carol Hutchins in her thirty-sixth season, played their home games at Alumni Field in Ann Arbor, Michigan. On March 12, 2020, the Big Ten Conference cancelled the remainder of all winter and spring sports seasons due to the COVID-19 pandemic.

== Previous season ==
The Wolverines finished the 2019 season 45–13 overall, and 22–1 in the Big Ten, finishing in first place in their conference. Following the conclusion of the regular season, the Wolverines received an automatic bid to the 2019 NCAA Division I softball tournament after winning the 2019 Big Ten Conference softball tournament, and were defeated in the Regional Final by James Madison.

== Roster ==
2020 Michigan Wolverines softball team
Players
Coaches

#	Pos.	Name	Bats/throws	Height	Year	High school/junior college	Home town
3	OF	Lexie Blair	L/L	5 ft 4 in (1.63 m)	So	West Orange	Winter Garden, FL
4	RHP	Chandler Dennis	R/R	5 ft 9 in (1.75 m)	Fr	North Gwinnett	Suwanee, GA
5	C	Abby Skvarce	L/R	5 ft 8 in (1.73 m)	Sr	Clarkston	Clarkston, MI
7	INF	Madison Uden	L/R	5 ft 6 in (1.68 m)	Sr	Raymond S. Kellis	Glendale, AZ
8	RHP	Alex Storako	L/R	5 ft 11 in (1.8 m)	So	Lincoln-Way East	Frankfort, IL
10	LHP	Meghan Beaubien	L/L	5 ft 8 in (1.73 m)	Jr	Saint Mary Catholic Central	Newport, MI
11	OF	Lexi Voss	R/R	5 ft 8 in (1.73 m)	Fr	Marist	Palos Park, IL
12	LHP	Lauren Esman	L/L	5 ft 10 in (1.78 m)	Fr	Gull Lake	Kalamazoo, MI
13	INF	Taylor Bump	R/R	5 ft 10 in (1.78 m)	Jr	Canterbury School of Florida	St. Petersburg, FL
14	INF	Lou Allan	R/R	5 ft 5 in (1.65 m)	Jr	Oak Hills	Hesperia, CA
16	C	Jessica Garmen	R/R	5 ft 9 in (1.75 m)	Fr	Detroit Country Day	Waterford, MI
17	INF	Julia Jimenez	R/R	5 ft 3 in (1.6 m)	Fr	Etiwanda	Fontana, CA
18	RHP	Sarah Schaefer	R/R	5 ft 9 in (1.75 m)	Jr	Waukee	West Des Moines, IA
20	INF	Hannah Carson	L/R	5 ft 6 in (1.68 m)	So	Mount Pleasant	Weidman, MI
21	INF	Natalia Rodriguez	S/R	5 ft 4 in (1.63 m)	Jr	Montverde Academy	Clermont, FL
22	OF	Thais Gonzalez	L/R	5 ft 4 in (1.63 m)	Sr	St. Thomas Aquinas	Boca Raton, FL
23	INF	Gianna Carosone	R/R	5 ft 4 in (1.63 m)	So	Rancho	North Las Vegas, NV
24	INF	Morgan Overaitis	L/R	5 ft 4 in (1.63 m)	So	Salem	Canton, MI
25	U	Audrey Leclair	L/R	5 ft 8 in (1.73 m)	Fr	Phoenix Country Day	Phoenix, AZ
32	OF	Haley Hoogenraad	R/R	5 ft 9 in (1.75 m)	Sr	Zeeland West	Zeeland, MI

Head coach

Carol Hutchins (Michigan State)

Assistant coach(es)

Bonnie Tholl (Michigan)
Jennifer Brundage (UCLA)

Legend

- (C) Team captain
- (S) Suspended
- (I) Ineligible
- Injured
- Current redshirt

Roster

== Schedule and results ==
2020 Michigan Wolverines Softball Game Log
Regular season (15–8)

February (11–5)
Date	Opponent	Rank	Site/stadium	Score	Win	Loss	Save	Attendance	Overall record	B1G record
February 7	vs. Georgia State; USF Wilson-Demarini Tournament	No. 17	USF Softball Stadium; Tampa, FL	6–1	**Storako** (1–0)	Buck (0–1)	—	—	1–0	–
February 7	vs. Illinois State; USF Wilson-Demarini Tournament	No. 17	USF Softball Stadium	5–4	**Beaubien** (1–0)	Leonard (0–1)	**Storako** (1)	—	2–0	–
February 8	vs. No. 7 Florida; USF Wilson-Demarini Tournament	No. 17	USF Softball Stadium	11–2 (6)	**Storako** (2–0)	Lugo (1–1)	—	—	3–0	–
February 8	at USF; USF Wilson-Demarini Tournament	No. 17	USF Softball Stadium	2–1 (8)	**Beaubien** (2–0)	Corrick (0–2)	—	—	4–0	–
February 9	vs. Fresno State; USF Wilson-Demarini Tournament	No. 17	USF Softball Stadium	1–0 (9)	**Beaubien** (3–0)	Lung (2–1)	—	—	5–0	–
February 14	vs. Louisville; ACC/Big Ten Challenge	No. 11	Williams Field at Anderson Stadium; Chapel Hill, NC	6–2	**Storako** (3–0)	Harris (0–4)	**Beaubien** (1)	126	6–0	–
February 14	at No. 25 North Carolina; ACC/Big Ten Challenge	No. 11	Williams Field at Anderson Stadium	4–3	**Storako** (4–0)	Pickett (0–2)	—	389	7–0	–
February 15	at No. 25 North Carolina; ACC/Big Ten Challenge	No. 11	Williams Field at Anderson Stadium	4–0	**Beaubien** (4–0)	Pickett (0–3)	—	428	8–0	–
February 16	vs. Louisville; ACC/Big Ten Challenge	No. 11	Williams Field at Anderson Stadium	8–4	**Beaubien** (5–0)	Roby (2–3)	—	238	9–0	–
February 21	vs. Liberty; Gamecock Invitational	No. 8	Beckham Field; Columbia, SC	1–0	**Storako** (5–0)	Keeney (1–3)	**Beaubien** (2)	100	10–0	–
February 22	vs. Iowa State; Gamecock Invitational	No. 8	Beckham Field	1–5	Spelhaug (2–2)	**Beaubien** (5–1)	—	100	10–1	–
February 22	at No. 22 South Carolina; Gamecock Invitational	No. 8	Beckham Field	0–3	Ochs (3–0)	**Storako** (5–1)	—	1,119	10–2	–
February 23	vs. Liberty; Gamecock Invitational	No. 8	Beckham Field	5–6	Johnson (1–3)	**Beaubien** (5–2)	—	100	10–3	–
February 28	vs. Loyola Marymount; Judi Garman Classic	No. 13	Anderson Family Field; Fullerton, CA	1–2	Wilson (5–3)	**Beaubien** (5–3)	—	—	10–4	–
February 29	vs. No. 3 Texas; Judi Garman Classic	No. 13	Anderson Family Field	0–1	O'Leary (5–0)	**Beaubien** (5–4)	—	—	10–5	–
February 29	vs. No. 25 Texas Tech; Judi Garman Classic	No. 13	Anderson Family Field	6–2	**Storako** (6–1)	Edmoundson (6–4)	—	—	11–5	–

March (4–3)
Date	Opponent	Rank	Site/stadium	Score	Win	Loss	Save	Attendance	Overall record	B1G record
March 1	vs. No. 2 Washington; Judi Garman Classic	No. 13	Anderson Family Field	2–10 (5)	Plain (9–2)	**Storako** (6–2)	—	1,300	11–6	–
March 1	vs. Colorado State; Judi Garman Classic	No. 13	Anderson Family Field	1–0	**Beaubien** (6–4)	Jarecki (2–5)	—	—	12–6	–
March 3	vs. St. John's	No. 16	Easton Stadium; Los Angeles, CA	4–2	**Storako** (7–2)	Brown (5–6)	—	—	13–6	–
March 5	vs. Cal State Fullerton; Louisville Slugger Tournament	No. 16	Easton Stadium; Los Angeles, CA	5–1	**Beaubien** (7–4)	Martinez (5–4)	—	—	14–6	–
March 5	at No. 1 UCLA; Louisville Slugger Tournament	No. 16	Easton Stadium	0–2	Faraimo (12–1)	**Beaubien** (7–5)	—	353	14–7	–
March 6	vs. Boston University; Louisville Slugger Tournament	No. 16	Easton Stadium	2–1	**Storako** (8–2)	Gant (4–1)	—	—	15–7	–
March 6	vs. No. 22 UCF; Louisville Slugger Tournament	No. 16	Easton Stadium	2–3 (8)	White (9–2)	**Storako** (8–3)	—	—	15–8	–
March 14	Ball State	No. 18	Alumni Field; Ann Arbor, MI							
March 14	Ball State	No. 18	Alumni Field							
March 15	Ball State	No. 18	Alumni Field							
March 17	Western Michigan		Alumni Field							
March 20	Purdue		Alumni Field							
March 21	Purdue		Alumni Field							
March 22	Purdue		Alumni Field							
March 24	Toledo		Alumni Field							
March 27	at Wisconsin		Goodman Softball Complex; Madison, WI							
March 28	at Wisconsin		Goodman Softball Complex							
March 29	at Wisconsin		Goodman Softball Complex							

April
Date	Opponent	Rank	Site/stadium	Score	Win	Loss	Save	Attendance	Overall record	B1G record
April 3	Minnesota		Alumni Field							
April 4	Minnesota		Alumni Field							
April 5	Minnesota		Alumni Field							
April 7	Bowling Green		Alumni Field							
April 10	at Northwestern		Sharon J. Drysdale Field; Evanston, IL							
April 11	Northwestern		Sharon J. Drysdale Field							
April 12	Northwestern		Sharon J. Drysdale Field							
April 14	Central Michigan		Alumni Field							
April 15	Michigan State		Alumni Field							
April 17	Ohio State		Alumni Field							
April 18	Ohio State		Alumni Field							
April 19	Ohio State		Alumni Field							
April 21	Michigan State		Secchia Stadium; East Lansing, MI							
April 24	Maryland		Alumni Field							
April 25	Maryland		Alumni Field							
April 26	Maryland		Alumni Field							

May
Date	Opponent	Rank	Site/stadium	Score	Win	Loss	Save	Attendance	Overall record	B1G record
May 1	at Penn State		Beard Field; State College, PA							
May 2	at Penn State		Beard Field							
May 3	at Penn State		Beard Field							

Postseason

Big Ten Tournament
Date	Opponent	Rank	Site/stadium	Score	Win	Loss	Save	Attendance	Overall record	B1GT record
May 7–9			Eichelberger Field; Champaign, IL							

- Win
- Loss
- Postponement
- Bold: Wolverines team member
- Rankings from NFCA.
- (#) Tournament seedings in parentheses.

== Rankings ==
Ranking movements Legend: ██ Increase in ranking ██ Decrease in ranking ( ) = First-place votes
	Week																
Poll	Pre	1	2	3	4	5	6	7	8	9	10	11	12	13	14	15	Final
NFCA / USA Today	17	11	8 (1)	13	16	18											
Softball America	15	8	6	11	17	19											
ESPN.com/USA Softball	14	8	6 (1)	11	16	17											
D1Softball	18	13	11	13	18	18											
