= 2023 Michigan Wolverines softball team =

American college softball season

2023 Michigan Wolverines softball
- Conference: Big Ten Conference
- Record: 26–25 (10–13 Big Ten)
- Head coach: Bonnie Tholl (1st season)
- Assistant coaches: Jennifer Brundage (25th season); Amanda Chidester (1st season)
- Home stadium: Alumni Field

2023 Big Ten Conference softball standings
	Conf.				Overall
Team	W		L	PCT	W		L	PCT
No. 15 Northwestern ‍†‍‡‍^{y}	20	–	3	.870	42	–	13	.764
Indiana ‍‍‍^{y}	18	–	5	.783	44	–	18	.710
Minnesota ‍‍‍^{y}	17	–	6	.739	38	–	18	.679
Nebraska ‍‍‍^{y}	13	–	10	.565	36	–	22	.621
Wisconsin ‍‍‍	12	–	10	.545	27	–	20	.574
Ohio State ‍‍‍	12	–	11	.522	33	–	20	.623
Maryland ‍‍‍	11	–	11	.500	38	–	19	.667
Penn State ‍‍‍	11	–	11	.500	31	–	16	.660
Iowa ‍‍‍	10	–	13	.435	35	–	27	.565
Michigan ‍‍‍	10	–	13	.435	26	–	25	.510
Rutgers ‍‍‍	9	–	14	.391	32	–	25	.561
Illinois ‍‍‍	6	–	16	.273	29	–	27	.518
Purdue ‍‍‍	6	–	17	.261	23	–	30	.434
Michigan State ‍‍‍	4	–	19	.174	14	–	32	.304
† – Conference champion ‡ – Tournament champion y – Invited to the NCAA Tournament; As of May 28, 2023; Rankings from NFCA/USA Today

The 2023 Michigan Wolverines softball team was an American college softball team that represents the University of Michigan during the 2023 NCAA Division I softball season. The Wolverines, wee led by head coach Bonnie Tholl in her first season, and played their home games at Alumni Field in Ann Arbor, Michigan.

== Previous season ==
The Wolverines finished the 2022 season 38–18 overall, and 14–8 in the Big Ten, finishing in fifth place in their conference. Following the conclusion of the regular season, the Wolverines received an at-large bid to the 2022 NCAA Division I Softball Tournament and were defeated in the Regional Final by UCF.

== Preseason ==
On June 13, 2022, graduate student Alex Storako transferred to Oklahoma. The next day, sophomore pitcher Annabelle Widra transferred to Auburn. On July 5, 2022, Michigan added three transfer students, outfielder Ellie Mataya and pitchers Hannah George and Jessica LeBeau.

On August 24, 2022, long-time head coach Carol Hutchins announced her retirement after 38 years as head coach at Michigan. At the time of her retirement, she was the winningest coach in NCAA Division I history with a record of 1,707–555–5. During her career as head coach, Michigan never suffered a losing season, and she led the team to 22 Big Ten regular-season titles from 1995–2021, including nine in a row from 2008–16, 10 Big Ten Tournament championships, and qualified for the NCAA Tournament 29 times, including each of the last 27 years. Later that day former Michigan associate head coach Bonnie Tholl was promoted to head coach.

== Roster ==
2023 Michigan Wolverines softball team
Players
Coaches

#	Pos.	Name	Bats/throws	Height	Year	High school/junior college	Home town
1	OF	Ellie Sieler	L/L	5 ft 5 in (1.65 m)	So	Monroe	Monroe, MI
2	INF	Keke Tholl	R/R	5 ft 10 in (1.78 m)	Jr	Victor J. Andrew	Tinley Park, IL
3	OF	Lexie Blair	L/L	5 ft 4 in (1.63 m)	RS Sr	West Orange	Winter Garden, FL
4	INF	Ryleigh Carricaburu	R/R	5 ft 9 in (1.75 m)	So	Woodcrest Christian	Riverside, CA
5	INF	Kaylee Rodriguez	R/R	5 ft 5 in (1.65 m)	So	Doral Academy	Miami, FL
7	RHP	Maddie Erickson	L/R	5 ft 5 in (1.65 m)	Fr	Wilsonville	Wilsonville, OR
8	INF	Madi Ramey	L/R	5 ft 6 in (1.68 m)	Fr	Allen Park	Allen Park, MI
11	OF	Lexi Voss (C)	R/R	5 ft 8 in (1.73 m)	Sr	Marist	Palos Park, IL
12	RHP	Jessica LeBeau	L/R	5 ft 8 in (1.73 m)	Jr	Lake	Hartville, OH
14	INF	Janelle Ilacqua	R/R	5 ft 5 in (1.65 m)	Fr	Catawba Ridge	Fort Mill, SC
16	C	Jessica Garmen	R/R	5 ft 9 in (1.75 m)	Sr	Detroit Country Day	Waterford, MI
17	OF	Ellie Mataya	L/L	5 ft 5 in (1.65 m)	RS Sr	Lake Braddock	Burke, VA
18	RHP	Lauren Derkowski	R/R	5 ft 8 in (1.73 m)	So	York Community	Elmhurst, IL
20	U	Lilly Vallimont	R/R	5 ft 6 in (1.68 m)	Fr	Trenton	Trenton, MI
21	RHP	Hannah George	R/R	5 ft 5 in (1.65 m)	RS Sr	Northside	Columbus, GA
22	RHP	Emerson Aiken	R/R	5 ft 8 in (1.73 m)	So	Glen Allen	Henrico, VA
23	INF	Avery Fantucci	R/R	5 ft 8 in (1.73 m)	Fr	Marist	Atlanta. GA
24	U	Melina Livingston (C)	R/R	5 ft 2 in (1.57 m)	RS Sr	Regina	Harrison Township, MI
25	U	Audrey Leclair	L/R	5 ft 8 in (1.73 m)	Sr	Phoenix Country Day	Phoenix, AZ
32	INF	Ella McVey	L/R	5 ft 7 in (1.7 m)	So	Dowling Catholic	Des Moines, IA
44	U	Indian Langford	L/R	5 ft 2 in (1.57 m)	Fr	Poway	Poway, CA

Head coach

Bonnie Tholl (Michigan)

Assistant coach(es)

Jennifer Brundage (UCLA)
Amanda Chidester (Michigan)

Legend

- (C) Team captain
- (S) Suspended
- (I) Ineligible
- Injured
- Current redshirt

Roster

== Schedule and results ==
2023 Michigan Wolverines Softball Game Log
Regular season (26–24)

February (7–8)
Date	Opponent	Rank	Stadium Site	Score	Win	Loss	Save	Attendance	Overall record	B1G record
February 9	at USF		USF Softball Stadium; Tampa, FL	1–2 ^{(8)}	Dixon (1–0)	**Derkowski** (0–1)	Hill (1)	1,506	0–1	—
February 10	vs. Colgate; The Spring Games		Sleepy Hollow Sports Complex; Leesburg, FL	10–0 ^{(5)}	**LeBeau** (1–0)	Misken (0–1)	—	—	1–1	—
February 11	vs. Western Kentucky; The Spring Games		Sleepy Hollow Sports Complex; Leesburg, FL	5–2	**Derkowski** (1–1)	Houchens (0–1)	—	350	2–1	—
February 11	vs. Western Kentucky; The Spring Games		Sleepy Hollow Sports Complex; Leesburg, FL	5–2 ^{(9)}	**Derkowski** (2–1)	Gardner (1–2)	—	300	3–1	—
February 12	vs. Portland State; The Spring Games		Sleepy Hollow Sports Complex; Leesburg, FL	9–1 ^{(6)}	**LeBeau** (2–0)	Grey (2–1)	—	—	4–1	—
February 17	vs. No. 20 UCF; St. Pete/Clearwater Elite Invitational	No. 25	Eddie C. Moore Complex; Clearwater, FL	2–8	DeVoe (2–1)	**Derkowski** (2–2)	—	657	4–2	—
February 17	vs. Louisiana; St. Pete/Clearwater Elite Invitational	No. 25	Eddie C. Moore Complex; Clearwater, FL	7–6	**LeBeau** (3–0)	Landry (2–1)	—	657	5–2	—
February 18	vs. No. 5 Oklahoma State; St. Pete/Clearwater Elite Invitational	No. 25	Eddie C. Moore Complex; Clearwater, FL	6–15 ^{(6)}	Runner (1–0)	**LeBeau** (3–1)	—	5,632	5–3	—
February 18	vs. Mississippi State; St. Pete/Clearwater Elite Invitational	No. 25	Eddie C. Moore Complex; Clearwater, FL	5–4	**Derkowski** (3–2)	Hawk (1–2)	—	5,632	6–3	—
February 19	vs. No. 16 Duke; St. Pete/Clearwater Elite Invitational	No. 25	Eddie C. Moore Complex; Clearwater, FL	3–6	Davidson (2–1)	**LeBeau** (3–2)	Wright (1)	—	6–4	—
February 24	vs. Boise State; Stanford Invitational		Smith Family Stadium; Stanford, CA	2–4	Walljasper (4–1)	**Derkowski** (3–3)	—	57	6–5	—
February 24	vs. Nevada; Stanford Invitational		Smith Family Stadium; Stanford, CA	0–3	Craft (3–0)	**LeBeau** (3–3)	—	74	6–6	—
February 25	vs. Boise State; Stanford Invitational		Smith Family Stadium; Stanford, CA	2–1	**LeBeau** (4–3)	Caudill (1–3)	—	116	7–6	—
February 25	at No. 16 Stanford; Stanford Invitational		Smith Family Stadium; Stanford, CA	0–5	Vawter (5–1)	**Derkowski** (3–4)	—	315	7–7	—
February 26	at No. 16 Stanford; Stanford Invitational		Smith Family Stadium; Stanford, CA	1–3	Krause (3–1)	**LeBeau** (4–4)	—	115	7–8	—
February 28	at Saint Mary's		Cottrell Field; Moraga, CA	Cancelled						

March (9–5)
Date	Opponent	Rank	Stadium Site	Score	Win	Loss	Save	Attendance	Overall record	B1G record
March 2	vs. UCF; Judi Garman Classic		Anderson Family Field; Fullerton, CA	2–0	**LeBeau** (5–4)	Felton (3–3)	—	494	8–8	—
March 2	at Cal State Fullerton; Judi Garman Classic		Anderson Family Field; Fullerton, CA	2–1 ^{(8)}	**Derkowski** (4–4)	Sutherlin (4–2)	—	494	9–8	—
March 3	vs. No. 15 LSU; Judi Garman Classic		Anderson Family Field; Fullerton, CA	0–2	Kilponen (5–0)	**LeBeau** (5–5)	—	357	9–9	—
March 3	vs. Seattle; Judi Garman Classic		Anderson Family Field; Fullerton, CA	3–2	**Derkowski** (5–4)	Ilacqua (7–2)	—	325	10–9	—
March 4	vs. No. 2 UCLA; Judi Garman Classic		Anderson Family Field; Fullerton, CA	0–8 ^{(5)}	Faraimo (11–1)	**LeBeau** (5–6)	—	—	10–10	—
March 9	Kent State		Alumni Field; Ann Arbor, MI	4–0	**Derkowski** (6–4)	Kelly (2–4)	—	202	11–10	—
March 10	Georgia Southern		Alumni Field; Ann Arbor, MI	Cancelled						
March 11	Georgia Southern		Alumni Field; Ann Arbor, MI	Cancelled						
March 11	Kent State		Alumni Field; Ann Arbor, MI	Cancelled						
March 12	Kent State		Alumni Field; Ann Arbor, MI	Cancelled						
March 15	Bowling Green		Alumni Field; Ann Arbor, MI	9–0 ^{(5)}	**Derkowski** (7–4)	Anderson (5–2)	—	773	12–10	—
March 18	vs. Longwood; John Cropp Classic		John Cropp Stadium; Lexington, KY	2–1	**Derkowski** (8–4)	Burton (4–6)	—	—	13–10	—
March 18	at No. 14 Kentucky; John Cropp Classic		John Cropp Stadium; Lexington, KY	Cancelled						
March 19	vs. DePaul; John Cropp Classic		John Cropp Stadium; Lexington, KY	Cancelled						
March 19	at No. 14 Kentucky; John Cropp Classic		John Cropp Stadium; Lexington, KY	1–2	Schoonover(11–1)	**Derkowski** (8–5)	—	1,077	13–11	—
March 24	at Ohio State		Buckeye Field; Columbus, OH	Postponed						
March 25	at Ohio State		Buckeye Field; Columbus, OH	Postponed						
March 26	at Ohio State		Buckeye Field; Columbus, OH	3–1 ^{(10)}	**Derkowski** (9–5)	Smith (9–4)	—	1,773	14–11	1–0
March 26	at Ohio State		Buckeye Field; Columbus, OH	2–11 ^{(5)}	Ruck (5–4)	**LeBeau** (5–7)	—	1,325	14–12	1–1
March 27	at Ohio State		Buckeye Field; Columbus, OH	7–8	Smith (10–4)	**Derkowski** (9–6)	Ruck (1)	405	14–13	1–2
March 29	Oakland		Alumni Field; Ann Arbor, MI	9–0 ^{(5)}	**LeBeau** (6–7)	Campbell (5–4)	—	1,109	15–13	—
March 31	at Nebraska		Bowlin Stadium; Lincoln, NE	10–1 ^{(5)}	**Derkowski** (10–6)	Wallace (15–7)	—	691	16–13	2–2

April (8–8)
Date	Opponent	Rank	Stadium Site	Score	Win	Loss	Save	Attendance	Overall record	B1G record
April 1	at Nebraska		Bowlin Stadium; Lincoln, NE	0–8 ^{(5)}	Wallace (16–7)	**LeBeau** (6–8)	—	941	16–14	2–3
April 2	at Nebraska		Bowlin Stadium; Lincoln, NE	4–2	**Derkowski** (11–6)	Harness (8–4)	—	1,137	17–14	3–3
April 5	at Michigan State		Secchia Stadium; East Lansing, MI	Postponed						
April 7	Illinois		Alumni Field; Ann Arbor, MI	0–3	Sickels (11–6)	**Derkowski** (11–7)	—	1,339	17–15	3–4
April 8	Illinois		Alumni Field; Ann Arbor, MI	3–2	**LeBeau** (7–8)	McQueen (4–3)	**Derkowski** (2)	1,941	18–15	4–4
April 9	Illinois		Alumni Field; Ann Arbor, MI	2–1 ^{(8)}	**Derkowski** (12–7)	Sickels (11–7)	—	1,463	19–15	5–4
April 12	at Michigan State		Secchia Stadium; East Lansing, MI	5–2	**Derkowski** (13–7)	Guidry (2–7)	—	1,264	20–15	6–4
April 14	at Purdue		Bittinger Stadium; West Lafayette, IN	4–0	**Derkowski** (14–7)	Echazarreta (5–10)	—	509	21–15	7–4
April 15	at Purdue		Bittinger Stadium; West Lafayette, IN	2–3	Elish (8–2)	**LeBeau** (7–9)	—	686	21–16	7–5
April 15	at Purdue		Bittinger Stadium; West Lafayette, IN	5–0	**Derkowski** (15–7)	Echazarreta (5–11)	—	99	22–16	8–5
April 18	Michigan State		Alumni Field; Ann Arbor, MI	8–0 ^{(5)}	**Derkowski** (16–7)	Guidry (3–9)	—	2,104	23–16	9–5
April 21	No. 21 Northwestern		Alumni Field; Ann Arbor, MI	3–4 ^{(11)}	Boyd (7–3)	**LeBeau** (7–10)	—	1,384	23–17	9–6
April 22	No. 21 Northwestern		Alumni Field; Ann Arbor, MI	15–0 ^{(5)}	**Derkowski** (17–7)	Henry (10–2)	—	1,852	24–17	10–6
April 23	No. 21 Northwestern		Alumni Field; Ann Arbor, MI	0–3	Williams (12–1)	**Derkowski** (17–8)	—	2,130	24–18	10–7
April 28	Indiana		Alumni Field; Ann Arbor, MI	Postponed						
April 29	Indiana		Alumni Field; Ann Arbor, MI	1–4	Copeland (17–2)	**Derkowski** (17–9)	—	1,881	24–19	10–8
April 29	Indiana		Alumni Field; Ann Arbor, MI	1–15 ^{(6)}	Johnson (13–6)	**LeBeau** (7–11)	—	1,881	24–20	10–9
April 30	Indiana		Alumni Field; Ann Arbor, MI	5–6	Copeland (18–2)	**Derkowski** (17–10)	Johnson (4)	1,948	24–21	10–10

May (2–3)
Date	Opponent	Rank	Stadium Site	Score	Win	Loss	Save	Attendance	Overall record	B1G record
May 2	Western Michigan		Alumni Field; Ann Arbor, MI	9–1 ^{(5)}	**Derkowski** (18–10)	Godwin (4–10)	—	1,037	25–21	—
May 3	Oakland		Alumni Field; Ann Arbor, MI	13–0 ^{(5)}	**LeBeau** (8–11)	Konyvka (0–7)	—	318	26–21	—
May 5	at Minnesota		Jane Sage Cowles Stadium; Minneapolis, MN	0–3	Pease (24–6)	**Derkowski** (18–11)	—	830	26–22	10–11
May 6	at Minnesota		Jane Sage Cowles Stadium; Minneapolis, MN	10–13	Schwartz (2–1)	**Derkowski** (18–12)	—	863	26–23	10–12
May 7	at Minnesota		Jane Sage Cowles Stadium; Minneapolis, MN	0–2	Pease (25–6)	**Derkowski** (18–13)	—	961	26–24	10–13

Postseason (0–1)

Big Ten Tournament (0–1)
Date	Opponent	Rank	Site/stadium	Score	Win	Loss	Save	Attendance	Overall record	B1GT record
May 10	Penn State		Eichelberger Field; Champaign, IL	2–3	Lingenfelt (12–5)	**Derkowski** (18–14)	—	—	26–25	0–1

- Win
- Loss
- Postponement
- Bold: Wolverines team member
- Rankings from NFCA.
- (#) Tournament seedings in parentheses.

== Rankings ==
Ranking movements Legend: ██ Increase in ranking ██ Decrease in ranking — = Not ranked RV = Received votes
	Week																
Poll	Pre	1	2	3	4	5	6	7	8	9	10	11	12	13	14	15	Final
NFCA / USA Today	RV	25	RV	—	—	—	—	—	—	—	—	—	—	—	—	—	—
Softball America	21	—	—	—	—	—	—	—	—	—	—	—	—	—	—	—	—
ESPN.com/USA Softball	RV	RV	—	—	—	—	—	—	—	—	—	—	—	—	—	—	—
D1Softball	—	—	—	—	—	—	—	—	—	—	—	—	—	—	—	—	—
