= 2024 Michigan Wolverines softball team =

American college softball season

2024 Michigan Wolverines softball

Big Ten tournament champion

NCAA Stillwater Regional
- Conference: Big Ten Conference
- Record: 43–18 (18–5 Big Ten)
- Head coach: Bonnie Tholl (2nd season)
- Assistant coaches: Jennifer Brundage (26th season); Amanda Chidester (2nd season); Faith Canfield (3rd season)
- Home stadium: Alumni Field

2024 Big Ten Conference softball standings
	Conf.				Overall
Team	W		L	PCT	W		L	PCT
No. 25 Northwestern ‍†‍‍^{y}	19	–	3	.864	35	–	13	.729
Michigan ‍‍‡‍^{y}	18	–	5	.783	43	–	18	.705
Rutgers ‍‍‍	14	–	9	.609	33	–	22	.600
Nebraska ‍‍‍	12	–	9	.571	30	–	23	.566
Minnesota ‍‍‍	13	–	10	.565	28	–	25	.528
Indiana ‍‍‍^{y}	12	–	11	.522	40	–	20	.667
Penn State ‍‍‍^{y}	12	–	11	.522	35	–	20	.636
Ohio State ‍‍‍	12	–	11	.522	31	–	20	.608
Purdue ‍‍‍	11	–	12	.478	25	–	27	.481
Maryland ‍‍‍	8	–	15	.348	24	–	30	.444
Wisconsin ‍‍‍	8	–	15	.348	21	–	31	.404
Illinois ‍‍‍	7	–	15	.318	21	–	31	.404
Michigan State ‍‍‍	7	–	16	.304	21	–	30	.412
Iowa ‍‍‍	6	–	17	.261	18	–	28	.391
† – Conference champion ‡ – Tournament champion y – Invited to the NCAA Tournament; As of May 19, 2024; Rankings from NFCA/USA Today

The 2024 Michigan Wolverines softball team was an American college softball team that represented the University of Michigan during the 2024 NCAA Division I softball season. The Wolverines were led by head coach Bonnie Tholl in her second season, and played their home games at Alumni Field in Ann Arbor, Michigan. The Wolverines won the 2024 Big Ten softball tournament, and advanced to the 2024 NCAA Division I softball tournament.

== Previous season ==
The Wolverines finished the 2023 season 26–25 overall, and 10–13 in the Big Ten, finishing in ninth place in their conference. Michigan failed to make the NCAA tournament for the first time since 1994.

== Preseason ==
On July 17, 2023, Jennifer Brundage was promoted to associate head coach at Michigan. On July 21, 2023, Faith Canfield was promoted to assistant coach.

== Roster ==
2024 Michigan Wolverines softball team
Players
Coaches

#	Pos.	Name	Bats/throws	Height	Year	High school/junior college	Home town
1	OF	Ellie Sieler	L/L	5 ft 5 in (1.65 m)	Jr	Monroe	Monroe, MI
2	INF	Keke Tholl (C)	R/R	5 ft 10 in (1.78 m)	Sr	Victor J. Andrew	Tinley Park, IL
4	INF	Ryleigh Carricaburu	R/R	5 ft 9 in (1.75 m)	Sr	Woodcrest Christian	Riverside, CA
5	INF	Kaylee Rodriguez	R/R	5 ft 5 in (1.65 m)	Sr	Doral Academy	Miami, FL
7	RHP	Maddie Erickson	L/R	5 ft 5 in (1.65 m)	So	Wilsonville	Wilsonville, OR
8	INF	Madi Ramey	L/R	5 ft 6 in (1.68 m)	So	Allen Park	Allen Park, MI
11	U	Erin Hoehn	R/R	5 ft 7 in (1.7 m)	Fr	North Posey	Poseyville, IN
12	RHP	Jessica LeBeau (C)	L/R	5 ft 8 in (1.73 m)	Sr	Lake	Hartville, OH
13	OF	Jenissa Conway	R/R	5 ft 8 in (1.73 m)	Fr	Marysville	Olivehurst, CA
14	INF	Janelle Ilacqua	R/R	5 ft 5 in (1.65 m)	So	Catawba Ridge	Fort Mill, SC
17	INF	Lexi Dellamonica	R/R	5 ft 6 in (1.68 m)	Fr	Queen Creek	Queen Creek, AZ
18	RHP	Lauren Derkowski (C)	R/R	5 ft 8 in (1.73 m)	Jr	York Community	Elmhurst, IL
20	U	Lilly Vallimont	R/R	5 ft 6 in (1.68 m)	RS Fr	Trenton	Trenton, MI
21	RHP	Hannah George	R/R	5 ft 5 in (1.65 m)	GS	Northside	Columbus, GA
22	RHP	Emerson Aiken	R/R	5 ft 8 in (1.73 m)	Jr	Glen Allen	Henrico, VA
23	INF	Avery Fantucci	R/R	5 ft 8 in (1.73 m)	So	Marist	Atlanta. GA
24	U	Ava Costales	R/R	5 ft 4 in (1.63 m)	Fr	Lakeview	St. Clair Shores, MI
25	OF	Ella Stephenson	L/R	5 ft 9 in (1.75 m)	Fr	Algonac	Algonac, MI
32	INF	Ella McVey	L/R	5 ft 7 in (1.7 m)	Jr	Dowling Catholic	Des Moines, IA
44	U	Indian Langford	L/R	5 ft 2 in (1.57 m)	So	Poway	Poway, CA

Head coach

Bonnie Tholl (Michigan)

Assistant coach(es)

Jennifer Brundage (UCLA)
Amanda Chidester (Michigan
Faith Canfield (Michigan)

Legend

- (C) Team captain
- (S) Suspended
- (I) Ineligible
- Injured
- Current redshirt

Roster

== Schedule and results ==
2024 Michigan Wolverines Softball Game Log
Regular season (38–16)

February (10–7)
Date	Opponent	Rank	Stadium Site	Score	Win	Loss	Save	Attendance	Overall Record	B1G Record
February 9	vs. Illinois State; USF Tournament		USF Softball Stadium; Tampa, FL	5–3	**Derkowski** (1–0)	Meshnick (0–2)	**Hoehn** (1)	—	1–0	—
February 9	at USF; USF Tournament		USF Softball Stadium; Tampa, FL	0–1	Dixon (1–0)	**LeBeau** (0–1)	—	1,530	1–1	—
February 10	vs. Bethune–Cookman; USF Tournament		USF Softball Stadium; Tampa, FL	3–2	**LeBeau** (1–1)	Gonzalez (1–2)	—	—	2–1	—
February 10	vs. No. 17 Florida; USF Tournament		USF Softball Stadium; Tampa, FL	2–1 ^{(10)}	**Derkowski** (2–0)	Rothrock (0–1)	—	—	3–1	—
February 11	vs. Oregon State; USF Tournament		USF Softball Stadium; Tampa, FL	2–1	**Hoehn** (1–0)	Haendiges (1–1)	—	—	4–1	—
February 16	vs. Seton Hall; Joan Joyce Classic		Joan Joyce Field; Boca Raton, FL	3–0	**Derkowski** (3–0)	Carr (0–1)	**LeBeau** (1)	—	5–1	—
February 16	vs. Maine; Joan Joyce Classic		Joan Joyce Field; Boca Raton, FL	11–0 ^{(5)}	**Hoehn** (2–0)	Fallon (0–2)	—	—	6–1	—
February 17	vs. Louisville; Joan Joyce Classic		Joan Joyce Field; Boca Raton, FL	0–2	Zabala (4–1)	**LeBeau** (1–2)	—	—	6–2	—
February 17	at Florida Atlantic; Joan Joyce Classic		Joan Joyce Field; Boca Raton, FL	0–1	Schlotter (3–1)	**Derkowski** (3–1)	—	—	6–3	—
February 18	vs. Seton Hall; Joan Joyce Classic		Joan Joyce Field; Boca Raton, FL	Cancelled						
February 23	vs. Northern Colorado; UCSB Tournament		Campus Diamond; Santa Barbara, CA	9–1 ^{(5)}	**Hoehn** (3–0)	DiNapoli (0–3)	—	104	7–3	—
February 23	vs. Sacramento State; UCSB Tournament		Campus Diamond; Santa Barbara, CA	1–6	Bertuccio (2–1)	**Derkowski** (3–2)	—	89	7–4	—
February 24	vs. Sacramento State; UCSB Tournament		Campus Diamond; Santa Barbara, CA	4–3	**Hoehn** (4–0)	Evans (2–3)	—	102	8–4	—
February 24	vs. Northern Colorado; UCSB Tournament		Campus Diamond; Santa Barbara, CA	4–1	**LeBeau** (2–2)	Erin (3–3)	—	126	9–4	—
February 25	at UC Santa Barbara; UCSB Tournament		Campus Diamond; Santa Barbara, CA	6–1	**Derkowski** (4–2)	Waddell (1–5)	—	401	10–4	—
February 28	at Long Beach State		LBSU Softball Complex; Long Beach, CA	6–7 ^{(9)}	Fernandez (1–5)	**George** (0–1)	—	515	10–5	—
February 29	vs. No. 17 Texas A&M; Judi Garman Classic		Anderson Family Field; Fullerton, CA	0–6	Kennedy (8–0)	**Derkowski** (4–3)	—	100	10–6	—
February 29	at Cal State Fullerton; Judi Garman Classic		Anderson Family Field; Fullerton, CA	1–5	Rainey (3–3)	**Hoehn** (4–1)	—	301	10–7	—

March (14–4)
Date	Opponent	Rank	Stadium Site	Score	Win	Loss	Save	Attendance	Overall Record	B1G Record
March 1	vs. Oregon State; Judi Garman Classic		Anderson Family Field; Fullerton, CA	0–1	Garcia (3–3)	**Derkowski** (4–4)	—	—	10–8	—
March 1	vs. No. 18 UCLA; Judi Garman Classic		Anderson Family Field; Fullerton, CA	0–10 ^{(6)}	Terry (3–0)	**Hoehn** (4–2)	—	—	10–9	—
March 2	vs. No. 13 Florida; Judi Garman Classic		Anderson Family Field; Fullerton, CA	10–2 ^{(5)}	**Hoehn** (5–2)	Brown (8–1)	—	131	11–9	—
March 9	vs. Bowling Green; NKU Tournament		Frank Ignatius Grein Softball Field; Highland Heights, KY	Cancelled						
March 10	vs. Bowling Green; NKU Tournament		Frank Ignatius Grein Softball Field; Highland Heights, KY	8–0 ^{(6)}	**Hoehn** (6–2)	Denison (0–1)	—	75	12–9	—
March 10	at Northern Kentucky; NKU Tournament		Frank Ignatius Grein Softball Field; Highland Heights, KY	2–3	Hicks (6–8)	**Derkowski** (4–5)	Eads (2)	355	12–10	—
March 11	vs. Illinois State; NKU Tournament		Frank Ignatius Grein Softball Field; Highland Heights, KY	13–2 ^{(5)}	**Derkowski** (5–5)	Meshnick (3–8)	—	—	13–10	—
March 16	vs. South Dakota; Cardinal Classic		Ulmer Stadium; Louisville, KY	4–3	**Hoehn** (7–2)	Edwards (5–9)	—	454	14–10	—
March 16	at Louisville; Cardinal Classic		Ulmer Stadium; Louisville, KY	4–12 ^{(5)}	Zabala (11–4)	**Hoehn** (7–3)	—	454	14–11	—
March 17	vs. Dartmouth; Cardinal Classic		Ulmer Stadium; Louisville, KY	4–2	**Derkowski** (6–5)	McCarroll (1–3)	—	86	15–11	—
March 17	vs. Illinois; Cardinal Classic		Ulmer Stadium; Louisville, KY	4–1	**Hoehn** (8–3)	McQueen (6–5)	**Derkowski** (1)	106	16–11	—
March 19	Oakland		Alumni Field; Ann Arbor, MI	2–0	**Derkowski** (7–5)	Cambell (5–5)	—	677	17–11	—
March 23	Purdue		Alumni Field; Ann Arbor, MI	7–0	**Derkowski** (8–5)	Elish (2–4)	—	928	18–11	1–0
March 24	Purdue		Alumni Field; Ann Arbor, MI	11–3 ^{(5)}	**Hoehn** (9–3)	Klochack (3–3)	—	947	19–11	2–0
March 25	Purdue		Alumni Field; Ann Arbor, MI	6–2	**Derkowski** (9–5)	Gossett (4–6)	—	556	20–11	3–0
March 27	Toledo		Alumni Field; Ann Arbor, MI	12–3 ^{(6)}	**Hoehn** (10–3)	Knight (9–5)	—	841	21–11	—
March 29	at Indiana		Andy Mohr Field; Bloomington, IN	15–6 ^{(6)}	**Derkowski** (10–5)	Copeland (12–6)	—	523	22–11	4–0
March 30	at Indiana		Andy Mohr Field; Bloomington, IN	7–1	**Hoehn** (11–3)	Copeland (12–7)	—	732	23–11	5–0
March 31	at Indiana		Andy Mohr Field; Bloomington, IN	10–1 ^{(5)}	**Derkowski** (11–5)	Cooper (0–1)	—	347	24–11	6–0

April (13–3)
Date	Opponent	Rank	Stadium Site	Score	Win	Loss	Save	Attendance	Overall Record	B1G Record
April 3	at Notre Dame		Melissa Cook Stadium; Notre Dame, IN	Postponed						
April 5	at Northwestern		Sharon J. Drysdale Field; Evanston, IL	1–9 ^{(5)}	Miller (9–4)	**Derkowski** (11–6)	—	405	24–12	6–1
April 6	at Northwestern		Sharon J. Drysdale Field; Evanston, IL	5–8	Grudzielanek (6–1)	**Hoehn** (11–4)	Cunningham (2)	935	24–13	6–2
April 6	at Northwestern		Sharon J. Drysdale Field; Evanston, IL	4–5	Miller (10–4)	**Derkowski** (11–7)	—	988	24–14	6–3
April 9	at Michigan State		Secchia Stadium; East Lansing, MI	11–5	**Hoehn** (12–4)	Taylor (1–9)	—	1,117	25–14	7–3
April 10	Central Michigan		Alumni Field; Ann Arbor, MI	5–0	**Hoehn** (13–4)	Wallace (1–7)	**Derkowski** (2)	1,271	26–14	—
April 12	Iowa		Alumni Field; Ann Arbor, MI	Postponed						
April 13	Iowa		Alumni Field; Ann Arbor, MI	8–6	**George** (1–1)	Adams (9–8)	**Hoehn** (2)	1,975	27–14	8–3
April 13	Iowa		Alumni Field; Ann Arbor, MI	9–8 ^{(8)}	**Derkowski** (12–7)	Judisch (0–2)	—	1,975	28–14	9–3
April 14	Iowa		Alumni Field; Ann Arbor, MI	6–5	**George** (2–1)	Adams (9–9)	—	2,079	29–14	10–3
April 16	Michigan State		Alumni Field; Ann Arbor, MI	5–1	**Hoehn** (14–4)	Roberts (0–1)	**Derkowski** (3)	1,752	30–14	11–3
April 19	Nebraska		Alumni Field; Ann Arbor, MI	4–3 ^{(9)}	**George** (3–1)	Kinney (15–11)	—	1,354	31–14	12–3
April 20	Nebraska		Alumni Field; Ann Arbor, MI	6–5	**George** (4–1)	Harness (5–4)	—	1,987	32–14	13–3
April 21	Nebraska		Alumni Field; Ann Arbor, MI	11–3 ^{(6)}	**Derkowski** (13–7)	Kinney (15–12)	—	1,986	33–14	14–3
April 23	at Oakland		Oakland Softball Field; Rochester, MI	9–4	**George** (5–1)	Smith (1–2)	—	—	34–14	—
April 26	at Penn State		Beard Field at Nittany Lion Softball Park; State College, PA	2–0	**Derkowski** (14–7)	Nemeth (21–4)	—	839	35–14	15–3
April 27	at Penn State		Beard Field at Nittany Lion Softball Park; State College, PA	14–3 ^{(6)}	**George** (6–1)	Volpe (8–6)	—	782	36–14	16–3
April 28	at Penn State		Beard Field at Nittany Lion Softball Park; State College, PA	3–2 ^{(9)}	**Derkowski** (15–7)	Nemeth (21–5)	—	1,077	37–14	17–3

May (1–2)
Date	Opponent	Rank	Stadium Site	Score	Win	Loss	Save	Attendance	Overall Record	B1G Record
May 3	Ohio State		Alumni Field; Ann Arbor, MI	9–6	**Derkowski** (16–7)	Ruck (8–5)	**George** (1)	2,131	38–14	18–3
May 4	Ohio State		Alumni Field; Ann Arbor, MI	0–6	Paulsen (3–2)	**Hoehn** (14–5)	—	2,432	38–15	18–4
May 5	Ohio State		Alumni Field; Ann Arbor, MI	1–2	Smith (18–9)	**Derkowski** (16–8)	—	2,206	38–16	18–5

Post-season (5–2)

Big Ten Tournament (3–0)
Date	Opponent	Rank	Site/Stadium	Score	Win	Loss	Save	Attendance	Overall Record	B1GT Record
May 9	Maryland		Pearl Field; Iowa City, IA	10–0 ^{(5)}	**Derkowski** (17–8)	Wyche (13–15)	—	—	39–16	1–0
May 10	Wisconsin		Pearl Field; Iowa City, IA	6–4	**Derkowski** (18–8)	Salo (5–5)	—	680	40–16	2–0
May 11	Indiana		Pearl Field; Iowa City, IA	3–1	**Derkowski** (19–8)	Copeland (20–11)	—	692	41–16	3–0

Stillwater Regional (2–2)
Date	Opponent	Rank	Site/stadium	Score	Win	Loss	Save	Attendance	Overall record	Regional record
May 17	vs. Kentucky		Cowgirl Stadium; Stillwater, OK	3–4	Schoonover (19–9)	**Derkowski** (19–9)	—	—	41–17	0–1
May 18	vs. Northern Colorado		Cowgirl Stadium; Stillwater, OK	4–2	**George** (7–1)	Caviness (17–10)	—	698	42–17	1–1
May 18	vs. Kentucky		Cowgirl Stadium; Stillwater, OK	4–2	**Hoehn** (15–5)	Schoonover (19–11)	**George** (2)	753	43–17	2–1
May 19	vs. Oklahoma State		Cowgirl Stadium; Stillwater, OK	1–4	Kilfoyl (24–3)	**Derkowski** (19–10)	—	1,072	43–18	2–2

- Win
- Loss
- Postponement
- Bold: Wolverines team member
- Rankings from NFCA.
- (#) Tournament seedings in parentheses.

== Rankings ==
Ranking movements Legend: ██ Increase in ranking ██ Decrease in ranking — = Not ranked RV = Received votes
	Week																
Poll	Pre	1	2	3	4	5	6	7	8	9	10	11	12	13	14	15	Final
NFCA / USA Today	—	—	—	—	—	—	—	—	—	—	—	—	—	—	—		
Softball America	—	—	—	—	—	—	—	—	—	—	—	—	25	—	—		
ESPN.com/USA Softball	RV	RV	—	—	—	—	—	—	—	—	—	—	RV	—	RV		
D1Softball	—	—	—	—	—	—	—	—	—	—	—	—	—	—	—		
