= Ashlynd Barker =

American football player (born 2003)

No. 7 – Florida State Seminoles
- Position: Safety
- Class: Redshirt Senior

Personal information
- Born: September 18, 2003 (age 23)
- Listed height: 6 ft 3 in (1.91 m)
- Listed weight: 218 lb (99 kg)

Career information
- High school: Northside (Columbus, Georgia)
- College: Iowa Western (2022); Florida State (2023–present)
- Stats at ESPN

Ashlynd Barker (born September 18, 2003) is an American football safety who is currently in the NCAA transfer portal. He previously played for the Florida State Seminoles and Iowa Western Community College.

== Early life ==
Barker attended Northside High School in Columbus, Georgia. Coming out of high school, he committed to play college football at Iowa Western Community College.

== College career ==
In his lone season at Iowa Western in 2022, Barker was redshirted as the team won a national title.

Barker transferred to play for the Florida State Seminoles. In his first season as a Seminole in 2023, he played in all 14 games, recording 11 tackles and a sack. In the 2024 season, Barker appeared in 11 games, totaling 19 tackles and an interception. He entered the 2025 season as a starter in the Seminoles secondary alongside Earl Little Jr. Barker played in 11 games with 9 starts, notching 48 tackles with five going for a loss, three and a half sacks, and two pass deflections. After the conclusion of the season, he entered the NCAA transfer portal.
