= 2022 Big Ten softball tournament =

College softball tournament in Michigan

- Teams: 12
- Format: Single-elimination tournament
- Finals site: Secchia Stadium; East Lansing, Michigan
- Champions: Nebraska (1st title)
- Runner-up: Michigan (16th title game)
- Winning coach: Rhonda Revelle (1st title)
- MVP: Cam Ybarra (Nebraska)
- Television: Big Ten Network

2022 Big Ten Conference softball standings
	Conf.						Overall
Team	W		L		T	PCT	W		L		T	PCT
No. 10 Northwestern ‍†‍‍^{y}	19	–	4	–	0	.826	45	–	13	–	0	.776
Nebraska ‍‍‡‍^{y}	17	–	5	–	0	.773	41	–	16	–	0	.719
Illinois ‍‍‍^{y}	15	–	7	–	0	.682	34	–	22	–	0	.607
Maryland ‍‍‍	14	–	8	–	0	.636	29	–	23	–	0	.558
No. 24 Michigan ‍‍‍^{y}	14	–	8	–	0	.636	38	–	18	–	0	.679
Ohio State ‍‍‍^{y}	13	–	9	–	0	.591	36	–	17	–	0	.679
Penn State ‍‍‍	13	–	10	–	0	.565	32	–	22	–	0	.593
Wisconsin ‍‍‍^{y}	12	–	11	–	0	.522	30	–	21	–	0	.588
Minnesota ‍‍‍^{y}	11	–	12	–	0	.478	27	–	26	–	1	.509
Indiana ‍‍‍	10	–	13	–	0	.435	27	–	22	–	0	.551
Purdue ‍‍‍	7	–	15	–	0	.318	24	–	31	–	0	.436
Michigan State ‍‍‍	4	–	16	–	0	.200	24	–	28	–	0	.462
Rutgers ‍‍‍	3	–	17	–	0	.150	25	–	30	–	0	.455
Iowa ‍‍‍	3	–	20	–	0	.130	21	–	31	–	0	.404
† – Conference champion ‡ – Tournament champion y – Invited to the NCAA tournament As of June 5, 2022; Rankings from NFCA/USA Today

The 2022 Big Ten softball tournament was held at Secchia Stadium in East Lansing, Michigan, from May 11 through May 14, 2022. As the tournament winner, Nebraska earned the Big Ten Conference's automatic bid to the 2022 NCAA Division I softball tournament. All games of the tournament were aired on BTN. This was the first tournament since 2019, after the previous two tournaments were cancelled due to the COVID-19 pandemic.

== Seeds ==
The top 12 Big Ten schools participate in the tournament. Teams are seeded by conference record, with the top four teams receiving a first-round bye.

== Schedule ==
Game	Time*	Matchup^{#}	Score	Television
First Round – Wednesday, May 11
1	11:00 a.m.	#7 Penn State vs. #10 Indiana	2–1^{(8)}	Big Ten Network
2	1:30 p.m.	#6 Ohio State vs. No. 11 Purdue	8–0^{(5)}	Big Ten Network
3	4:30 p.m.	#8 Wisconsin vs. #9 Minnesota	2–0	Big Ten Network
4	7:00 p.m.	#5 Maryland vs. #12 Michigan State	7–1	Big Ten Network
Quarterfinals – Thursday, May 12
5	11:00 a.m.	#2 Nebraska vs. #7 Penn State	3–1	Big Ten Network
6	1:30 p.m.	#3 Illinois vs. #6 Ohio State	1–5	Big Ten Network
7	4:30 p.m.	#1 Northwestern vs. #8 Wisconsin	5–2	Big Ten Network
8	7:00 p.m.	#4 Michigan vs. #5 Maryland	7–0	Big Ten Network
Semifinals – Friday, May 13
9	2:00 p.m.	#2 Nebraska vs. #6 Ohio State	7–1	Big Ten Network
10	5:00 p.m.	#1 Northwestern vs. #4 Michigan	1–2	Big Ten Network
Championship – Saturday, May 11
11	11:00 a.m.	#2 Nebraska vs. #4 Michigan	3–1^{(8)}	Big Ten Network
*Game times in EDT. # – Rankings denote tournament seed.

== Bracket ==
1st Round; May 11; BTN
7	Penn State	2^{(8)}
10	Indiana	1
6	Ohio State	8^{(6)}
11	Purdue	0
8	Wisconsin	2
9	Minnesota	0
5	Maryland	7
12	Michigan State	1

Quarterfinals; May 12; BTN
2	Nebraska	3
7	Penn State	1
3	Illinois	1
6	Ohio State	5
1	Northwestern	5
8	Wisconsin	2
4	Michigan	7
5	Maryland	0

Semifinals; May 13; BTN
2	Nebraska	2
6	Ohio State	1
1	Northwestern	1
4	Michigan	2

Finals; May 14; BTN
2	Nebraska	3^{(8)}
4	Michigan	1
