= 2023 Big Ten softball tournament =

College softball tournament in Illinois

- Teams: 12
- Format: Single-elimination tournament
- Finals site: Eichelberger Field; Champaign, Illinois
- Champions: Northwestern (2nd title)
- Runner-up: Indiana (1st title game)
- Winning coach: Kate Drohan (2nd title)
- MVP: Danielle Williams (Northwestern)
- Television: Big Ten Network

2023 Big Ten Conference softball standings
	Conf.				Overall
Team	W		L	PCT	W		L	PCT
No. 15 Northwestern ‍†‍‡‍^{y}	20	–	3	.870	42	–	13	.764
Indiana ‍‍‍^{y}	18	–	5	.783	44	–	18	.710
Minnesota ‍‍‍^{y}	17	–	6	.739	38	–	18	.679
Nebraska ‍‍‍^{y}	13	–	10	.565	36	–	22	.621
Wisconsin ‍‍‍	12	–	10	.545	27	–	20	.574
Ohio State ‍‍‍	12	–	11	.522	33	–	20	.623
Maryland ‍‍‍	11	–	11	.500	38	–	19	.667
Penn State ‍‍‍	11	–	11	.500	31	–	16	.660
Iowa ‍‍‍	10	–	13	.435	35	–	27	.565
Michigan ‍‍‍	10	–	13	.435	26	–	25	.510
Rutgers ‍‍‍	9	–	14	.391	32	–	25	.561
Illinois ‍‍‍	6	–	16	.273	29	–	27	.518
Purdue ‍‍‍	6	–	17	.261	23	–	30	.434
Michigan State ‍‍‍	4	–	19	.174	14	–	32	.304
† – Conference champion ‡ – Tournament champion y – Invited to the NCAA Tournament; As of May 28, 2023; Rankings from NFCA/USA Today

The 2023 Big Ten softball tournament was held at Eichelberger Field in Champaign, Illinois from May 10 through May 13, 2023. As the tournament winner, Northwestern earned the Big Ten Conference's automatic bid to the 2023 NCAA Division I softball tournament. All games of the tournament were aired on BTN.

== Seeds ==
The top 12 Big Ten schools participated in the tournament. Teams were seeded by conference record, with the top four teams receiving a first-round bye.

== Schedule ==
Game	Time*	Matchup^{#}	Score	Television
First Round – Wednesday, May 10
1	11:00 a.m.	No. 6 Ohio State vs. No. 11 Rutgers	7–4	Big Ten Network
2	1:30 p.m.	No. 7 Penn State vs. No. 10 Michigan	3–2	Big Ten Network
3	4:30 p.m.	No. 8 Maryland vs. No. 9 Iowa	1–7	Big Ten Network
4	7:00 p.m.	No. 5 Wisconsin vs. No. 12 Illinois	4–8	Big Ten Network
Quarterfinals – Thursday, May 11
5	11:00 a.m.	No. 3 Minnesota vs. No. 6 Ohio State	3–2^{(8)}	Big Ten Network
6	1:30 p.m.	No. 2 Indiana vs. No. 7 Penn State	5–4^{(9)}	Big Ten Network
7	4:30 p.m.	No. 1 Northwestern vs. No. 9 Iowa	3–1	Big Ten Network
8	7:00 p.m.	No. 4 Nebraska vs. No. 12 Illinois	1–0	Big Ten Network
Semifinals – Friday, May 12
9	5:00 p.m.	No. 3 Minnesota vs. No. 2 Indiana	3–5	Big Ten Network
10	7:30 p.m.	'No. 1 Northwestern vs. No. 4 Nebraska	8–0^{(5)}	Big Ten Network
Championship – Saturday, May 13
11	3:00 p.m.	No. 2 Indiana vs. No. 1 Northwestern	1–2	Big Ten Network
*Game times in EDT. # – Rankings denote tournament seed.

== Bracket ==
1st Round; May 10; BTN
7	Penn State	3
10	Michigan	2
6	Ohio State	7
11	Rutgers	4
8	Maryland	1
9	Iowa	7
5	Wisconsin	4
12	Illinois	8

Quarterfinals; May 11; BTN
2	Indiana	5^{(9)}
7	Penn State	4
3	Minnesota	3^{(8)}
6	Ohio State	2
1	Northwestern	3
9	Iowa	1
4	Nebraska	1
12	Illinois	0

Semifinals; May 12; BTN
2	Indiana	5
3	Minnesota	3
1	Northwestern	8^{(5)}
4	Nebraska	0

Finals; May 13; BTN
2	Indiana	1
1	Northwestern	2
