= 2024 Big Ten softball tournament =

College softball tournament in Iowa

- Teams: 12
- Format: Single-elimination tournament
- Finals site: Pearl Field; Iowa City, Iowa
- Champions: Michigan (11th title)
- Runner-up: Indiana (2nd title game)
- Winning coach: Bonnie Tholl (1st title)
- MVP: Lauren Derkowski (Michigan)
- Television: Big Ten Network

2024 Big Ten Conference softball standings
	Conf.				Overall
Team	W		L	PCT	W		L	PCT
No. 25 Northwestern ‍†‍‍^{y}	19	–	3	.864	35	–	13	.729
Michigan ‍‍‡‍^{y}	18	–	5	.783	43	–	18	.705
Rutgers ‍‍‍	14	–	9	.609	33	–	22	.600
Nebraska ‍‍‍	12	–	9	.571	30	–	23	.566
Minnesota ‍‍‍	13	–	10	.565	28	–	25	.528
Indiana ‍‍‍^{y}	12	–	11	.522	40	–	20	.667
Penn State ‍‍‍^{y}	12	–	11	.522	35	–	20	.636
Ohio State ‍‍‍	12	–	11	.522	31	–	20	.608
Purdue ‍‍‍	11	–	12	.478	25	–	27	.481
Maryland ‍‍‍	8	–	15	.348	24	–	30	.444
Wisconsin ‍‍‍	8	–	15	.348	21	–	31	.404
Illinois ‍‍‍	7	–	15	.318	21	–	31	.404
Michigan State ‍‍‍	7	–	16	.304	21	–	30	.412
Iowa ‍‍‍	6	–	17	.261	18	–	28	.391
† – Conference champion ‡ – Tournament champion y – Invited to the NCAA Tournament; As of May 19, 2024; Rankings from NFCA/USA Today

The 2024 Big Ten softball tournament was held at Pearl Field in Iowa City, Iowa from May 8 through May 11, 2024. As the tournament winner, Michigan earned the Big Ten Conference's automatic bid to the 2024 NCAA Division I softball tournament. All games of the tournament were aired on BTN.

== Seeds ==
The top 12 Big Ten schools participate in the tournament. Teams are seeded by conference record, with the top four teams receiving a first-round bye.

== Schedule ==
Game	Time*	Matchup^{#}	Score	Television
First Round – Wednesday, May 8
1	11:00 a.m.	No. 8 Indiana vs. No. 9 Purdue	6–3	Big Ten Network
2	1:30 p.m.	No. 5 Minnesota vs. No. 12 Illinois	10–7^{(9)}	Big Ten Network
3	4:30 p.m.	No. 7 Penn State vs. No. 10 Maryland	1–3^{(9)}	Big Ten Network
4	7:00 p.m.	No. 6 Ohio State vs. No. 11 Wisconsin	1–5	Big Ten Network
Quarterfinals – Thursday, May 9
5	11:00 a.m.	No. 1 Northwestern vs. No. 8 Indiana	3–4	Big Ten Network
6	1:30 p.m.	No. 4 Nebraska vs. No. 5 Minnesota	11–2^{(5)}	Big Ten Network
7	4:30 p.m.	No. 2 Michigan vs. No. 10 Maryland	10–0^{(5)}	Big Ten Network
8	7:00 p.m.	No. 3 Rutgers vs. No. 11 Wisconsin	3–7	Big Ten Network
Semifinals – Friday, May 10
9	5:00 p.m.	No. 8 Indiana vs. No. 4 Nebraska	9–5^{(8)}	Big Ten Network
10	7:30 p.m.	No. 2 Michigan vs. No. 11 Wisconsin	6–4	Big Ten Network
Championship – Saturday, May 11
11	3:00 p.m.	No. 8 Indiana vs. No. 2 Michigan	1–3	Big Ten Network
*Game times in CDT. # – Rankings denote tournament seed.

== Tournament ==
1st Round; May 8th BTN
7	Penn State	1
10	Maryland	3^{(9)}
6	Ohio State	1
11	Wisconsin	5
8	Indiana	6
9	Purdue	3
5	Minnesota	10^{(9)}
12	Illinois	7

Quarterfinals; May 9th BTN
2	Michigan	10^{(5)}
10	Maryland	0
3	Rutgers	3
11	Wisconsin	7
1	Northwestern	3
8	Indiana	4
4	Nebraska	11^{(5)}
5	Minnesota	2

Semifinals; May 10th BTN
2	Michigan	6
11	Wisconsin	4
8	Indiana	9^{(8)}
4	Nebraska	5

Finals; May 11th BTN
2	Michigan	3
8	Indiana	1
