= Northside High School (Columbus, Georgia) =

Location
- 2002 American Way; Columbus, Georgia 31909; United States; 32°34′17″N 84°56′07″W

Information
- Type: Public engineering, engineering design, and biomedical science academy
- Established: 2002
- Principal: Nathan Laney
- Faculty: 89.20 (FTE)
- Enrollment: 1,417 (2023–2024)
- Student to teacher ratio: 15.89
- Colors: Red, white, and blue
- Mascot: Patriot
- Information: (706) 748-2920
- Partners in Education: Bytewise, Chick-fil-A, Columbus Quarry, Columbus Technical College, Maximus, Inc., Pratt-Whitney
- Website: Northside High School

Northside High School is located in Columbus, Georgia, United States. It was founded in 2002. Originally, the mascot was planned to be the Wolverine, but after the September 11 attacks, the mascot was changed to the Patriot. They have outstanding programs like engineering and biomedical science. Northside High School also participates in many local fundraisers through their many clubs and organizations.

== Activities ==
=== Athletics ===
- Baseball
- Boys'/girls' basketball
- Cheerleading (competition and football)
- Cross country
- Drill team
- Football
- Boys'/girls' golf
- Patriot Marching Band
- JROTC Raiders
- Rifle: 2005, 2006, and 2007 State Champions
- Boys'/girls' Soccer
- Softball
- Swim Team
- Boys'/girls' tennis team
- Boys'/girls' track and field
- Volleyball
- Wrestling: Area Champions 2005
- Northside Patriots Marching Band

=== Clubs and organizations ===
Northside clubs and organizations include the following:

- Academic Decathlon
- Annual
- Art Club
- Astronomy Club
- BEST Robotics
- Concert Band
- DECA
- Dinner theater
- Engineering Honor Society
- FBLA
- FIRST Robotics Competition
- HOSA
- Jazz Band
- JROTC
- Literary magazine
- Madrigal dinner
- Marching Band
- Math Team
- Mock Trial
- Model United Nations
- Mu Alpha Theta
- National Art Honor Society
- National Honor Society
- National Technical Honor Society
- Newspaper
- Northside Singers
- One Act Play
- Percussion Ensemble
- Poetry Club
- Science Honor Society
- Skills USA
- Spanish Club
- Speech/Debate Team
- Symphonic Band
- Technology Student Association

=== Publications ===
The yearbook is produced by students in the Yearbook class, a split class lasting all year. The school newspaper is written by the school's journalism class. The literary magazine is written by the journalism class and select students who turn in their original work.

- Amor Patriae, yearbook
- The Patriot Reveille, newspaper
- The Lantern, literature/art magazine

== Notable alumni ==
- Katherine Webb (Class of 2007)
- Ashlynd Barker (2022) – college football safety for the Florida State Seminoles
