= 2019 Big Ten softball tournament =

College softball tournament in Indiana

- Teams: 12
- Format: Single-elimination
- Finals site: Andy Mohr Field; Bloomington, Indiana
- Champions: Michigan (10th title)
- Runner-up: Minnesota (8th title game)
- Winning coach: Carol Hutchins (10th title)
- MVP: Meghan Beaubien (Michigan)
- Television: Big Ten Network

The 2019 Big Ten softball tournament was held at Andy Mohr Field on the campus of Indiana University in Bloomington, Indiana from May 9 through May 11, 2019. As the tournament winner, Michigan earned the Big Ten Conference's automatic bid to the 2019 NCAA Division I softball tournament. All games of the tournament aired on BTN.

== Tournament ==
2019 Big Ten Conference softball standings
	Conf.				Overall
Team	W		L	PCT	W		L	PCT
No. 20 Michigan ‍†‍‡‍^{y}	22	–	1	.957	45	–	13	.776
No. 14 Northwestern ‍‍‍^{y}	21	–	2	.913	47	–	13	.783
No. 8 Minnesota ‍‍‍^{y}	20	–	2	.909	46	–	14	.767
Ohio State ‍‍‍^{y}	17	–	6	.739	35	–	18	.660
No. 25 Wisconsin ‍‍‍^{y}	15	–	8	.652	43	–	14	.754
Rutgers ‍‍‍	11	–	12	.478	29	–	26	.527
Indiana ‍‍‍	10	–	13	.435	36	–	21	.632
Illinois ‍‍‍^{y}	9	–	14	.391	33	–	25	.569
Nebraska ‍‍‍	9	–	14	.391	21	–	31	.404
Penn State ‍‍‍	7	–	16	.304	24	–	32	.429
Purdue ‍‍‍	6	–	17	.261	34	–	29	.540
Iowa ‍‍‍	5	–	18	.217	19	–	32	.373
Michigan State ‍‍‍	4	–	18	.182	16	–	34	.320
Maryland ‍‍‍	4	–	19	.174	20	–	31	.392
† – Conference champion ‡ – Tournament champion y – Invited to the NCAA tournament As of June 14, 2019; Rankings from NFCA

1st Round; May 9th BTN
8	Nebraska	4
9	Illinois	6
5	Wisconsin	7
12	Iowa	4
7	Indiana	4
10	Penn State	2
6	Rutgers	3
11	Purdue	4

Quarterfinals; May 10th BTN
1	Michigan	1^{(8)}
9	Illinois	0
4	Ohio State	1
5	Wisconsin	10^{(6)}
2	Northwestern	2
7	Indiana	0
3	Minnesota	4
11	Purdue	3

Semifinals; May 11th BTN
1	Michigan	8
5	Wisconsin	3
2	Northwestern	0
3	Minnesota	4

Finals; May 11th BTN
1	Michigan	3
3	Minnesota	2

- Only the top 12 participate in the tournament.

== Schedule ==
Game	Time*	Matchup^{#}	Television	TV Announcers	Attendance
First Round – Thursday, May 9
1	11:00 a.m.	#5 Wisconsin vs. #12 Iowa	Big Ten Network	Lisa Byington & Carol Bruggeman	
2	1:30 p.m.	#8 Nebraska vs. #9 Illinois	Big Ten Network	Lisa Byington & Carol Bruggeman	
3	4:30 p.m.	#7 Indiana vs. #10 Penn State	Big Ten Network	Dean Linke & Jennie Ritter	
4	7:00 p.m.	#6 Rutgers vs. #11 Purdue	Big Ten Network	Dean Linke & Jennie Ritter	
Quarterfinals – Friday, May 10
5	11:00 a.m.	#4 Ohio State vs. #5 Wisconsin	Big Ten Network	Lisa Byington & Carol Bruggeman	
6	1:30 p.m.	#1 Michigan vs. #9 Illinois	Big Ten Network	Lisa Byington & Carol Bruggeman	
7	4:30 p.m.	#2 Northwestern vs. #7 Indiana	Big Ten Network	Dean Linke & Jennie Ritter	
8	7:00 p.m.	#3 Minnesota vs. #11 Purdue	Big Ten Network	Dean Linke & Jennie Ritter	
Semifinals – Saturday, May 11
9	9:00 a.m.	#1 Michigan vs. #5 Wisconsin	Big Ten Network		
10	11:30 a.m.	#2 Northwestern vs. #3 Minnesota	Big Ten Network		
Championship – Saturday, May 11
11	2:00 p.m.	#1 Michigan vs. #3 Minnesota	Big Ten Network		
*Game times in EDT. # – Rankings denote tournament seed.
