= Alex Storako =

American softball pitcher

Oklahoma City Spark
- Pitcher
- Born: March 6, 2000 (age 26); Frankfort, Illinois, U.S.

Teams
- Michigan (2019–2022); Oklahoma (2023); Oklahoma City Spark (2023–present)

Career highlights and awards
- Women's College World Series champion (2023); Second Team All-American (2021); Big Ten Pitcher of the Year (2021); 2× All-Big Ten First Team (2021, 2022); All-Big 12 Second Team (2023)

Alex Ryann Storako (born March 6, 2000) is an American softball pitcher for the Oklahoma City Spark of Women's Professional Fastpitch (WPF). She played college softball for Michigan and Oklahoma. As a junior in 2021, she set a Michigan program record with 22 strikeouts in a game and was named Big Ten Pitcher of the Year.

== Early life ==
Storako was born in Frankfort, Illinois, to Rob and Jamie Storako, and moved to Bourbonnais, Illinois at the age of seven. Storako attended Bishop McNamara High School in Kankakee, Illinois her freshman and sophomore years of high school, before transferring to Lincoln-Way East High School in Frankfort, Illinois.

== High school career ==
As a freshman, she averaged more than a strikeout per inning and pitched the Irish to a third-place finish in Class 2A. As a sophomore, she led Bishop McNamara to the Class 3A Elite Eight, and finished the season with a 1.85 earned run average (ERA) and 201 strikeouts. Offensively, she hit .433 with 19 extra-base hits and 35 RBI. She earned second-team all-state honors in 2016.

Following her sophomore year, she transferred to Lincoln-Way East High School in Frankfort, Illinois. As a junior, she posted a 22–3 record with a 0.86 ERA and 289 strikeouts in 178 1/3 innings. Offensively, she hit .419 with eight doubles, four home runs and 35 RBIs. She was subsequently named The Herald-News Co-Softball Player of the Year, and Daily Southtown Softball Player of the Year, and earned first-team all-state honors in 2017.

As a senior, she posted a record of 21–2 with a 0.76 ERA and 255 strikeouts in 128 2/3 innings. Offensively she hit .439 with 11 doubles, five home runs and 31 RBIs while having a .780 slugging percentage and a .495 on-base percentage. Following an outstanding season she was named the 2017–18 Lincoln-Way East High School's Senior Female Athlete of the Year, Southwest Suburban Conference Softball Player of the Year and The Herald-News Softball Player of the Year, and earned first-team all-state honors in 2018.

She finished her high school career with a 70–19 win–loss record and 918 strikeouts.

== College career ==
Storako made her collegiate debut in the season opener against NC State on February 8, 2019, striking out six through three hitless innings. During her freshman year, she posted a 14–6 record with a 2.02 ERA and 190 strikeouts through 142 1/3 innings. She earned back-to-back Big Ten Freshman of the Week honors to close out the regular season, and was named the Big Ten All-Freshman Team. During her sophomore year, she posted an 8–3 record with a 2.43 ERA and 141 strikeouts through 75 innings in a season that was cancelled after 23 games due to the COVID-19 pandemic. She ranked fourth nationally in total strikeouts (141) and third in strikeouts per seven innings (13.2).

During her junior year, she posted a 22–3 record with a 1.05 earned-run average, 270 strikeouts and a .138 opponent batting average. She posted seven complete-game shutouts and contributed to six more. On March 11, 2021, in the second game of a double-header against Nebraska, Storako tied the Michigan single-game strikeout record with a career-best 19 strikeouts in a one-hit complete game shutout. On May 5, 2021, she set a Michigan single-game record with 22 strikeouts in a 1-0 victory over rival Michigan State. She allowed just two hits and two walks over nine innings en route to the complete-game shutout.

Storako led the nation with 12.9 strikeouts per seven innings and ranked fourth with 3.26 hits allowed per seven innings, and ranked eighth with her 1.05 ERA. Following an outstanding season, she was named Big Ten Conference Pitcher of the Year, a unanimous selection to the All-Big Ten first team, and named NFCA second-team All-American.

On March 5, 2022, Storako pitched her first career no-hitter and struck out 13 batters in a game against Drake. She was a sixth-inning walk away from a perfect game. During her senior year, she posted a 22–7 record with a 1.69 earned-run average, 274 strikeouts and a .167 opponent batting average. She led the conference and in total strikeouts (274), strikeouts per seven innings (11.3) and shutouts (9).

On June 13, 2022, Storako announced she would transfer to Oklahoma for her final year of eligibility. In her four seasons with the Wolverines, she posted a 69–20 record, 20 shutouts, a 1.71 lifetime ERA, and 901 strikeouts in 563 2/3 innings. In her final season at Oklahoma, she finished with an 18-0 win/loss record and an ERA of 1.15. She played a crucial part in Oklahoma's winning a third straight NCAA Division 1 national championship.

== Professional career ==
On April 17, 2023, Storako was drafted first overall by the Oklahoma City Spark in the 2023 Women's Professional Fastpitch draft. She now works for the Big 10 Conference in Chicago.
