= Canterbury School (St. Petersburg, Florida) =

Private prep school in Florida, US

Coordinates: 27.825135°N 82.620883°W

Canterbury School of Florida

Location
- 990 62nd Avenue NE (Knowlton Campus); St. Petersburg, Florida 33702; United States

Information
- School type: Private
- Denomination: Episcopal
- Established: 1968
- CEEB code: 101504
- Head of school: Hollis A. Lawson
- Teaching staff: 72 (as of 2015–16)
- Grades: PK3–12
- Enrollment: 450 (as of 2015–16)
- Student to teacher ratio: 15:1 (as of 2015–16)
- Colours: Blue and Gold
- Mascot: Crusader
- Website: www.canterburyflorida.org

Canterbury School of Florida is a private, co-ed, college preparatory school on two campuses in Saint Petersburg, Florida serving three-year-olds through Grade 12. Founded in 1968, Canterbury School of Florida serves Pinellas County, Florida.

== Location ==
Canterbury School of Florida is situated on two campuses in northeast St. Petersburg. The Hough Campus at 1200 Snell Isle Blvd. is for PK3 - grade 4. The 11-acre Knowlton Campus at 990 62nd Ave. NE is for grades 5-12.

The Knowlton Campus is home to a 2,800 square foot Cousteau Center for Marine Studies, as well as the Dollinger Center, the school's 483-seat theater used for productions for both campuses, and the gymnasium and three athletic fields.

In 2015, a Maker Space on the Hough Campus and Innovation Lab on the Knowlton Campus were created to integrate technology and STEAM (Science, Technology, Engineering, Arts, Math) into the entire curriculum at every grade level.

== Curriculum ==
Honors, Advanced Honors, and 24 Advanced Placement courses are offered. Canterbury supports experiential learning by incorporating field trips, community service, and the maker space and innovation lab into the curriculum to enhance classroom instruction. There is a strong focus on Marine Studies for all students, PK3 - Grade 12, as it is the first school to be a Cousteau Divers partner school, which means that all studies and underwater data recorded by students during their studies can be accessed and used in international marine studies.

== Extracurricular activities ==
Athletics

Canterbury has 33 athletic teams in three seasons (Fall, Winter, Spring) at multiple levels (Middle School, Junior Varsity, and Varsity), for football, cheerleading, golf, swimming, volleyball, basketball, soccer, baseball, softball, tennis, and track and field.

In 2015 the boys Varsity Basketball team won the District Championships.

The Varsity Softball team won State titles in 2011, 2013, 2014, 2017, and 2021.

Clubs, Activities & Honor Societies for Middle and Upper School Students

There are more than 30 in-school and after-school clubs and activities offered to Middle and Upper School students at no cost. Clubs include: Student Council, Thespian and Junior Thespian Troupes, ROV Club, Debate Club, Photojournalism, iPad Medics, Model UN, Girls On The Run, Book Club, SADD, Geography Club, International Studies Club, Recycling Team, Mu Alpha Theta, Interact, Ocean Bowl, Envirothon and Songwriter's Workshop. Students must be inducted into Honor Societies such as NHS, NJHS, French Honor Society, and Spanish Honor Society.

Additionally, all grades (4-12) take an overnight class trip during the year.

All students have the opportunity to try out for school plays and productions and students in the 6th grade a higher can join after school athletic teams.

== Notable alumni ==
- Chris Fuller, the filmmaker behind Loren Cass and Gracie, was a graduate in the Class of 2001.
- Jonathan Serrie, a Fox News Correspondent based in the Southeastern United States, was a graduate in the Class of 1983.
- Joshua McQueen, an ex-competitive swimmer and host of the YouTube channel, JugComics, was a graduate in the Class of 2018.
- Dante Tornello, who raced the Mazda MX-5 Cup race of the annual Firestone Grand Prix of St. Petersburg, graduated from Canterbury in 2014.
