= Bonnie Tholl =

American softball player

Current position
- Title: Head coach
- Team: Michigan
- Conference: Big Ten
- Record: 144–86 (.626)

Biographical details
- Born: June 30, 1969 (age 57); Tinley Park, Illinois, U.S.

Playing career
- 1988–1991: Michigan
- Position: Shortstop

Coaching career (HC unless noted)
- 1992–1993: Indiana (GA)
- 1994–2002: Michigan (asst.)
- 2003–2022: Michigan (AHC)
- 2023–present: Michigan

Head coaching record
- Overall: 144–86 (.626)

Accomplishments and honors

Championships
- 2× Big Ten Tournament Champions (2024, 2025)

Bonita Lynn Tholl (born June 30, 1969) is an American former softball player, who is currently the head coach for the Michigan Wolverines softball team.

== Playing career ==
After graduating from Victor J. Andrew High School in Tinley Park, Illinois, Tholl played softball at the University of Michigan and started at the position Shortstop from 1988 to 1991. She led the team in runs for three straight years from 1989 to 1991 and she also led the team in walks for three seasons (1988, 1989, 1991). She also shares the Big Ten record for fewest strikeouts in a conference season with zero in 1991. She is the University of Michigan record holder for most stolen bases in a game with 4 stolen bases against FAMU in 1990. She was the captain of the team and received the 1991 Maize and Blue Award.

Tholl was the first player in the Big Ten to earn All-Big Ten first team honors four times. She was named part of the Big Ten All-Decade (1982–1992) softball team.

Tholl graduated from the University of Michigan with a degree in sports management and communications in 1991. She also has a Master of Science degree in athletic administration from Indiana Hoosiers from 1993.

== Coaching career ==
On August 28, 2002, Tholl was promoted to the associate head coach for the Michigan Wolverines softball team. Tholl helped lead the 2005 Michigan Wolverines softball team to their first Women's College World Series in 2005.

On August 24, 2022, following the retirement of long-time head coach Carol Hutchins, Tholl was promoted to head coach.

== Head coaching record ==
=== College ===
Record table
Season	Team	Overall	Conference	Standing	Postseason
Michigan Wolverines (Big Ten Conference) (2023–Present)
2023	Michigan	26–25	10–13	10th	
2024	Michigan	43–18	18–5	2nd	NCAA Regional
2025	Michigan	39–21	11–11	T–8th	NCAA Regional
2026	Michigan	36–22	11–13	T–9th	NCAA Regional
Michigan:		144–86 (.626)	50–42 (.543)		
Total:		144–86 (.626)			
National champion Postseason invitational champion Conference regular season champion Conference regular season and conference tournament champion Division regular season champion Division regular season and conference tournament champion Conference tournament champion
