= Woodcrest Christian High School =

Private christian high school in California, United States

Coordinates: 33°53′11″N 117°20′32″W

Information
- Grades: 9-12
- Colors: Purple and gold
- Website: wcss.org/high-school/

Woodcrest Christian High School is a private Christian high school located in Riverside, California, United States, in the census-designated place of Woodcrest. It is part of the Woodcrest Christian School System, which includes the Woodcrest Christian Middle School, and the Woodcrest Christian Day School. The system was founded in 1948 with Riverside Christian Day School (TK-6) by Matilda Randall, now called Woodcrest Christian Day School, and expanded with the Woodcrest campus (7-12) in 1973. Woodcrest Christian High School's school colors are purple and gold.

As of 2023, annual tuition is (USD) $11,930.

== Notable alumni ==
- Odette Annable, actress
- Jason Martin, musician
- Trevor Oaks, professional baseball player for the San Francisco Giants
