= Phoenix Country Day School =

Location
- 3901 E. Stanford Dr. Paradise Valley, Arizona; United States; 33°30′57″N 111°59′50″W

Information
- Type: Private
- Established: 1961
- Head of School, Headmaster: Andrew Rodin
- Enrollment: 760
- Colors: Blue and gold
- Mascot: Eagle
- Website: Phoenix Country Day School

Phoenix Country Day School (PCDS) is a college-preparatory school located in Paradise Valley, Arizona, United States.

The student-faculty ratio at Phoenix Country Day School is 8 to 1.

Facilities on the campus include access to most sports and indoor activities.

== History ==
Phoenix Country Day School was founded in 1960, when a group of educators led by Franz and Mae Sue Talley agreed to found a nonsectarian, nonprofit, college preparatory day school based on the traditional east coast private school model. Franz Talley was the founder of an aerospace/defense contractor in Mesa, which grew into conglomerate Talley Industries before the businesses were largely sold off in the years after his death in 1978.

On September 12, 1961, Phoenix Country Day School opened with ninety-three students in grades 3-9 with a faculty and staff of 14. By 1965, kindergarten and grades 1 and 2 were added, and grades 10 through 12 were added to graduate the first senior class in 1965. By the 1969–1970 academic year, enrollment was at 386.

In the 1970s, facilities were expanded to accommodate the growing student body and the development of competitive sports teams. The school's graduating classes measured in the teens and twenties, and the upper school program offered core graduation requirements and courses and electives that reflected faculty interests and abilities.

In the 1980s, having purchased the second half of the school's now 40 acres in 1968, Phoenix Country Day School was able in 1982 to build a new upper school complex and a gymnasium for indoor sports on the east side of the Cudia Wash, and a dedicated music facility on the west side of campus. A bridge was built to join the lower and middle schools with the upper school.

By 1996 enrollment reached 700. Between 1993 and 2008, the school replaced or renovated a large portion of its classrooms. Every division saw major construction and renovation, including the addition of state-of-the-art science labs and an outdoor experimental science garden, visual art and performance facilities, and technology facilities. The entire lower school was replaced, and an early childhood learning center was added. This part of campus also has a library, science center, art studio, and children's garden.

== School sections ==
The lower school consists of 220 students in grades K through 4, and the curriculum includes the study of music, art, science, physical education, technology, library science, and Spanish.

The middle school has 230 students in grades 5 through 8. For these students, the school offers athletics programs, class trips, electives, and grade-level projects.

The upper school has 308 students in grades 9 through 12. The upper school students mix a liberal arts-based academic schedule with sports, social activities, and community service. Although AP courses are no longer offered, AP tests can still be taken at the end of the year. and students can select from 17 varsity sports and 15 extracurricular activities.

== Thrive campaign ==
On the school's annual Blue and Gold Day (October 17, 2014), the school kicked off its THRIVE fundraising campaign with a video featuring many faculty members and students. The campaign promised to bring about new projects, such as a new indoor athletic complex and art/science center.

== Extracurricular programs ==
Phoenix Country Day School offers extracurricular programs for middle and upper school students.

=== Junior Classical League ===
The school's Junior Classical League has won many State Conventions in the Junior Classical League. The school has both a middle school and upper school team which it sends to the convention every year, with the upper school having won the past three conventions in a row.

=== Speech and Debate ===
The school's policy debate team won a number of 1A-3A state competitions over the past 10 years. The Lincoln-Douglas Debate and Speech started in 2013, very successfully. Today, the congressional debate team is one of the strongest in the nation, with countless finals, including one competitor in the National Senate Final, in addition to briefly being the leader in bids for the Tournament of Champions in 2023 and 2024. In 2025, the Congressional Debate team for Phoenix Country Day schools is ranked number one in the nation.

=== Robotics ===
The FIRST Robotics team, Blue Tide Robotics, started in 2007 with several middle-school students' participation in FIRST Lego League. In 2014, they qualified for the semifinals again and also won the Quality Award.

== Athletics ==
Phoenix Country Day School competes as a member school of the Arizona Interscholastic Association.

=== Varsity football ===
PCDS competed in tackle football from 1964 until 1972. PCDS enjoyed their best season in 1966.

==== 1964 season ====
In the first year of the PCDS varsity football, the team won no games, lost 6, and tied in 1.

==== 1965 season ====
In the 1965 season, the team improved winning 1 game, but losing 6.

==== 1966 season ====
The 1966 season was the best season of PCDS varsity football. The team posted a record of 5 wins and 3 losses. The offense scored an average of 21 points per game, and the defense held their ground too, shutting out four of their eight opponents. The offense's ground-and-pound play style led to the breakout seasons of star halfbacks Dick Usher and Rob Backing. Each running back recorded 8 touchdowns throughout the season. Triple-threat quarterback Marc Brooks threw for 7 touchdowns and completed 70% of his passes.

==== 1967–1972 seasons ====
Not much information could be found on the 1967-1972 seasons

Phoenix Country day school no longer competes in football. Instead, Phoenix Country Day School has strong teams for girls and boys basketball and boys and girls soccer. The boys soccer team won the AIA State Championship in 2025.
