= Jennifer Brundage =

American softball player

Current position
- Title: Associate head coach
- Team: Michigan
- Conference: Big Ten

Biographical details
- Born: June 27, 1973 (age 53); Orange, California, U.S.

Playing career
- 1992–1995: UCLA
- Position: Pitcher

Coaching career (HC unless noted)
- 1996–1997: Chattanooga (asst.)
- 1997–1998: UCLA (asst.)
- 1999–2023: Michigan (asst.)
- 2024–present: Michigan (AHC)

Accomplishments and honors

Awards
- Honda Sports Award (1995)
Medal record
Women's softball
Representing the United States
Olympic Games
Gold medal – first place	2000 Sydney	Team competition

Jennifer Lynn Brundage (born June 27, 1973) is an American, former collegiate All-American softball player and current associate head coach for Michigan. She played college softball for the UCLA Bruins from 1992 to 1995 and won the 1992 Women's College World Series. Brundage was named Honda Sports Award for softball as Player of the Year in 1995. As a part of Team USA softball, she won a gold medal at the 2000 Sydney Olympics.

== Career ==
She competed at the 2000 Summer Olympics in Sydney where she received a gold medal as a member of the American winning team.

Brundage was a four-year letter receiver in softball at UCLA. She won the Honda Sports Award as the nation's top softball player in 1995. She began her college softball career as assistant coach at UCLA Bruins, then was an assistant coach at the University of Tennessee, Chattanooga before joining the University of Michigan coaching staff in 1998.

== Coaching career ==
Brundage helped lead the 2005 Michigan Wolverines softball team to their first Women's College World Series in 2005 as an assistant coach and pitching coach.

On July 17, 2023, Jennifer Brundage was promoted to associate head coach at Michigan.

== Statistics ==
UCLA Bruins
YEAR	G	AB	R	H	BA	RBI	HR	3B	2B	TB	SLG	BB	SO	SB	SBA
1992	55	164	22	49	.299	29	1	0	10	62	.378%	9	9	2	2
1993	47	124	14	34	.274	23	1	2	9	50	.403%	5	7	0	0
1994	57	158	29	69	.437	39	4	0	11	92	.582%	33	10	0	0
1995	56	168	59	87	.518	60	14	3	15	150	.893%	37	17	6	9
TOTALS	215	614	124	239	.389	151	20	5	45	354	.576%	84	43	8	11

Team USA
YEAR	G	AB	R	H	BA	RBI	HR	3B	2B	TB	SLG	BB	SO
2000 OLYMPICS	10	32	4	9	.281	3	2	0	1	16	.500%	4	7
